This is a list of foreign players in the Bundesliga, which commenced play in 1963. The following players must meet both of the following two criteria:
Have played at least one Bundesliga game. Players who were signed by Bundesliga clubs, but only played in lower league, cup and/or European games, or did not play in any competitive games at all, are not included. Players of 2. Bundesliga clubs are also not included.
Are considered foreign, i.e., outside Germany determined by the following:
A player is considered foreign if he is not eligible to play for the national team of Germany.
More specifically,
If a player has been capped on international level, the national team is used; if he has been capped by more than one country, the highest level (or the most recent) team is used. These include German players with dual citizenship.
If a player has not been capped on international level, his country of birth is used, except those who were born abroad from German parents or moved to Germany at a young age, and those who clearly indicated to have switched his nationality to another nation.

Clubs listed are those for which the player has played at least one Bundesliga game—and seasons are those in which the player has played at least one Bundesliga game. Note that seasons, not calendar years, are used. For example, "1992–95" indicates that the player has played in every season from 1992–93 to 1994–95, but not necessarily every calendar year from 1992 to 1995. Therefore, a player should always have a listing under at least two years — for instance, a player making his debut in 2014, during the 2013–14 season, will have '2013–14' after his name. This follows general practice in expressing sporting seasons.

Also please consider, that season specifications shall only be divided into more than one element, if a player has at least one season played no game in the Bundesliga. For example, a player plays in 2012–13 at club "A" and in 2013–14 at club "B", the correct season specification is "2012–14". This approach is used to keep the list more clear and readable.

In bold: players who have played at least one Bundesliga game in the current season (2020–21), and are still at the clubs for which they have played. This does not include current players of a Bundesliga club who have not played a Bundesliga game in the current season.

Naturalized players

  Gerald Asamoah – FC Schalke 04, St. Pauli, Greuther Fürth – 2001–11, 2012–13
  Cacau – 1. FC Nürnberg, VfB Stuttgart – 2001–14
  Sean Dundee – Karlsruher SC, VfB Stuttgart – 1995–98, 1999–2003
   Kevin Kurányi – VfB Stuttgart, Schalke 04, 1899 Hoffenheim – 2001–10, 2015–16
  Oliver Neuville – Hansa Rostock, Bayer Leverkusen, Borussia M'gladbach – 1997–2007, 2008–10
  Paulo Rink – Bayer Leverkusen, 1. FC Nürnberg, Energie Cottbus – 1997–2003
  Mirko Votava – Borussia Dortmund, Werder Bremen – 1976–82, 1985–97

UEFA

Albania
 Amir Abrashi – SC Freiburg – 2016–21
 Geri Çipi – Eintracht Frankfurt – 2003–04
 Mehmet Dragusha – Eintracht Frankfurt – 2003–04
 Klodian Duro – Arminia Bielefeld – 2004–05
 Jürgen Gjasula – 1. FC Kaiserslautern – 2004–05
 Klaus Gjasula – SC Paderborn – 2019–20
 Besnik Hasi – 1860 Munich – 1997–98
 Jahmir Hyka – Mainz 05 – 2009–10
 Edmond Kapllani – Karlsruher SC, FC Augsburg – 2007–09, 2011–12
 Bekim Kastrati – Borussia M'gladbach – 2005–06
 Altin Lala – Hannover 96 – 2002–12
 Mërgim Mavraj – VfL Bochum, Greuther Fürth, 1. FC Köln, Hamburger SV – 2007–10, 2012–13, 2014–18
 Valdet Rama – Hannover 96 – 2009–10
 Odise Roshi – 1. FC Köln – 2011–12
 Altin Rraklli – SC Freiburg, SpVgg Unterhaching – 1993–96, 1999–2001
 Ervin Skela – Eintracht Frankfurt, Arminia Bielefeld, 1. FC Kaiserslautern, Energie Cottbus – 2003–09
 Igli Tare – Karlsruher SC, 1. FC Kaiserslautern – 1996–97, 1999–2001
 Fatmir Vata – Arminia Bielefeld – 2002–03, 2004–07
 Rudi Vata – Energie Cottbus – 2000–02
 Hysen Zmijani – FC St. Pauli – 1995–96

Armenia
 Sargis Adamyan – 1899 Hoffenheim, 1. FC Köln – 2019–
 Henrikh Mkhitaryan – Borussia Dortmund – 2013–16

Austria
 David Alaba – Bayern Munich, 1899 Hoffenheim – 2009–21
 Robert Almer – Fortuna Düsseldorf – 2012–13
 Marko Arnautović – Werder Bremen – 2010–14
 Julian Baumgartlinger – Mainz 05, Bayer Leverkusen – 2011–
 Christoph Baumgartner – 1899 Hoffenheim – 2018–
 Michael Baur – Hamburger SV – 2002–03
 Guido Burgstaller – Schalke 04 – 2016–20
 Harald Cerny – Bayern Munich, 1860 Munich – 1992–94, 1995–2004
 Kevin Danso – FC Augsburg – 2016–19
 Marco Djuricin – Hertha BSC – 2011–12
 Aleksandar Dragović – Bayer Leverkusen – 2016–21
 Hans Ettmayer – VfB Stuttgart, Hamburger SV – 1971–77
 Wolfgang Feiersinger – Borussia Dortmund – 1996–2000
 Marco Friedl – Bayern Munich, Werder Bremen – 2017–21, 2022–
 Gernot Fraydl – Hertha BSC – 1968–70
 Christian Fuchs – VfL Bochum, Mainz 05, Schalke 04 – 2008–15
 György Garics – Darmstadt 98 – 2015–16
 Christian Gebauer – Arminia Bielefeld – 2020–2022
 Eduard Glieder – Schalke 04 – 2003–04
 Michael Gregoritsch – Hamburger SV, FC Augsburg, Schalke 04, SC Freiburg – 2015–
 Leo Greiml – Schalke 04 – 2022–
 Florian Grillitsch – Werder Bremen, 1899 Hoffenheim – 2015–22
 Max Hagmayr – Karlsruher SC – 1982–83
 Martin Harnik – Werder Bremen, VfB Stuttgart, Hannover 96 – 2007–09, 2010–16, 2017–20
 Franz Hasil – Schalke 04 – 1968–69
 Roland Hattenberger – VfB Stuttgart – 1977–81
 Andreas Herzog – Werder Bremen, Bayern Munich – 1992–2002
 Josef Hickersberger – Kickers Offenbach, Fortuna Düsseldorf – 1972–78
 Martin Hinteregger – Borussia M'gladbach, FC Augsburg, Eintracht Frankfurt – 2015–2022
 Reinhold Hintermaier – 1. FC Nürnberg, Eintracht Braunschweig – 1980–85, 1992–93
 Lukas Hinterseer – FC Ingolstadt – 2015–17
 Norbert Hof – Hamburger SV – 1969–70
 Erwin Hoffer – 1. FC Kaiserslautern, Eintracht Frankfurt – 2010–11, 2012–13
 Raphael Holzhauser – VfB Stuttgart, FC Augsburg – 2011–14
 Philipp Hosiner – 1. FC Köln – 2015–16
 Wilhelm Huberts – Eintracht Frankfurt – 1963–70
 Andreas Ibertsberger – SC Freiburg, 1899 Hoffenheim – 2004–05, 2008–12
 Muhammed Ildiz – 1. FC Nürnberg – 2012–13
 Stefan Ilsanker – RB Leipzig, Eintracht Frankfurt – 2016–2022
 Andreas Ivanschitz – Mainz 05 – 2009–13
 Lukas Jäger – 1. FC Nürnberg – 2018–19
 Kurt Jara – MSV Duisburg, Schalke 04 – 1975–81
 Zlatko Junuzović – Werder Bremen – 2011–18
 Florian Kainz – Werder Bremen, 1. FC Köln – 2016–
 Saša Kalajdžić – VfB Stuttgart – 2020–23
 Richard Kitzbichler – Hamburger SV – 2002–03
 Florian Klein – VfB Stuttgart – 2014–16
 Janos Kondert – Kickers Offenbach – 1968–69
 Ümit Korkmaz – Eintracht Frankfurt – 2008–11
 Bernd Krauss – Borussia Dortmund, Borussia M'gladbach – 1976–77, 1983–90 
 Dietmar Kühbauer – VfL Wolfsburg – 2000–02
 Konrad Laimer – RB Leipzig – 2017–
 Stefan Lainer – Borussia M'gladbach – 2019–
 Michael Langer – VfB Stuttgart, Schalke 04 – 2006–07, 2020–21
 Valentino Lazaro – Hertha BSC, Borussia M'gladbach – 2017–19, 2020–21
 Stefan Lexa – Eintracht Frankfurt – 2003–04, 2005–06
 Philipp Lienhart – SC Freiburg – 2017–
 Heinz Lindner – Eintracht Frankfurt – 2016–17
 Dejan Ljubicic – 1. FC Köln – 2021–
 Jürgen Macho – 1. FC Kaiserslautern – 2005–06
 Stefan Maierhofer – Bayern Munich – 2006–07
 Alex Manninger – FC Augsburg – 2012–16
 Stephan Marasek – SC Freiburg – 1996–97
 Georg Margreitter – 1. FC Nürnberg – 2018–19
 Hans-Dieter Mirnegg – MSV Duisburg – 1979–81
Marlon Mustapha – Mainz 05 – 2022–
 Phillipp Mwene – Mainz 05 – 2018–2022
 David Nemeth – Mainz 05 – 2021–2022
 Franz Oberacher – 1. FC Nürnberg – 1980–81
 Rubin Okotie – 1. FC Nürnberg – 2010–11
 Karim Onisiwo – Mainz 05 – 2015–
 Ramazan Özcan – 1899 Hoffenheim, FC Ingolstadt, Bayer Leverkusen – 2008–09, 2015–16, 2017–19
 Peter Pacult – 1860 Munich – 1994–95
 Thomas Parits – 1. FC Köln, Eintracht Frankfurt – 1970–74
 Pavao Pervan – VfL Wolfsburg – 2018–
 Bruno Pezzey – Eintracht Frankfurt, Werder Bremen – 1978–87
 Heimo Pfeifenberger – Werder Bremen – 1996–98
 Hans Pirkner – Schalke 04 – 1969–71
 Gernot Plassnegger – VfL Wolfsburg, Hansa Rostock – 2001–02, 2003–04
 Emanuel Pogatetz – Hannover 96, VfL Wolfsburg, 1. FC Nürnberg – 2010–14
 Toni Polster – 1. FC Köln, Borussia M'gladbach – 1993–99
 Mario Posch – Bayer Uerdingen – 1992–93
 Stefan Posch – 1899 Hoffenheim – 2017–
 Manuel Prietl – Arminia Bielefeld – 2020–2022
 Sebastian Prödl – Werder Bremen – 2008–15
 Christian Prosenik – 1860 Munich – 1999–2000
 Peter Pumm – Bayern Munich – 1968–71
 Marcus Pürk – 1860 Munich – 1999–2004
 Hannes Reinmayr – MSV Duisburg, Bayer Uerdingen – 1993–95
 Alfred Roscher – Waldhof Mannheim – 1987–88
 Daniel Royer – Hannover 96 – 2011–12
 Marcel Sabitzer – RB Leipzig, Bayern Munich – 2016–
 Samuel Şahin-Radlinger – Hannover 96 – 2018–19
 Ylli Sallahi – Bayern Munich – 2013–14
 Paul Scharner – Hamburger SV – 2012–13
 Louis Schaub – 1. FC Köln – 2019–20, 2021–2022
 Xaver Schlager – VfL Wolfsburg – 2019–
 Romano Schmid – Werder Bremen – 2020–21, 2022-
 Hans Schmidradner – Kickers Offenbach – 1972–76
 Peter Schmidt – 1. FC Kaiserslautern – 1968–69
 Alessandro Schöpf – Schalke 04, Arminia Bielefeld – 2015–2022
 Markus Schopp – Hamburger SV – 1996–98
 Helmut Siber – Kickers Offenbach – 1968–69
 August Starek – 1. FC Nürnberg, Bayern Munich – 1967–70
 Gerhard Steinkogler – Werder Bremen – 1979–80
 Josef Stering – 1860 Munich – 1979–80
 Kevin Stöger – Fortuna Düsseldorf, Mainz 05, VfL Bochum – 2018–
 Martin Stranzl – 1860 Munich, VfB Stuttgart, Borussia M'gladbach – 1998–2006, 2010–16
 Richard Strebinger – Werder Bremen – 2014–15
 Markus Suttner – FC Ingolstadt, Fortuna Düsseldorf – 2015–17, 2018–20
 Georg Teigl – FC Augsburg – 2016–17, 2018—20
 Christopher Trimmel – Union Berlin – 2019–
 Hans-Georg Tutschek – Eintracht Frankfurt – 1964–65
 Ivica Vastić – MSV Duisburg – 1993–94 
 Michael Wagner – SC Freiburg – 1996–97
 Clemens Walch – VfB Stuttgart, 1. FC Kaiserslautern – 2009–12
 Roman Wallner – Hannover 96 – 2004–05
 Markus Weissenberger – Arminia Bielefeld, 1860 Munich, Eintracht Frankfurt – 1999–2000, 2001–04, 2005–08
 Thomas Weissenberger – 1. FC Nürnberg – 1992–93
 Christoph Westerthaler – Eintracht Frankfurt – 1998–2000
 Gerd Wimmer – Eintracht Frankfurt, Hansa Rostock – 2000–01, 2002–04
 Kevin Wimmer – 1. FC Köln, Hannover 96 – 2014–15, 2018–19
 Patrick Wimmer – Arminia Bielefeld, VfL Wolfsburg – 2021–
 Franz Wohlfahrt – VfB Stuttgart – 1996–2000
 Hannes Wolf – RB Leipzig, Borussia M'gladbach – 2019–
 Philipp Zulechner – SC Freiburg – 2013–15
 Robert Žulj – 1899 Hoffenheim – 2017–18

Belarus
 Alexander Hleb – VfB Stuttgart, VfL Wolfsburg – 2000–05, 2009–10, 2011–12
 Vyacheslav Hleb – Hamburger SV – 2003–05
 Anton Putsila – Hamburger SV, SC Freiburg – 2007–08, 2010–13

Belgium

 Ismail Azzaoui – VfL Wolfsburg – 2015–16
 Logan Bailly – Borussia M'gladbach – 2008–12
 Michy Batshuayi – Borussia Dortmund – 2017–18
 Sebastiaan Bornauw – 1. FC Köln, VfL Wolfsburg – 2019–
 Dedryck Boyata – Hertha BSC – 2019–
 Massimo Bruno – RB Leipzig – 2016–17
 Koen Casteels – 1899 Hoffenheim, Werder Bremen, VfL Wolfsburg – 2012–
 Nico Claesen – VfB Stuttgart – 1984–86
 Roger Claessen – Alemannia Aachen – 1968–70
 Filip Daems – Borussia M'gladbach – 2004–06, 2008–14
 Kevin De Bruyne – Werder Bremen, VfL Wolfsburg – 2012–16
 Igor de Camargo – Borussia M'gladbach, 1899 Hoffenheim – 2010–13
 Nathan de Medina – Arminia Bielefeld – 2020–
 Jonas De Roeck – FC Augsburg – 2011–12
 Didier Dheedene – 1860 Munich – 2001–02
 Landry Dimata – VfL Wolfsburg – 2017–18
 Arne Engels – FC Augsburg – 2022–
 Bart Goor – Hertha BSC – 2001–04
 Michaël Goossens – Schalke 04 – 1997–2000
 Thorgan Hazard – Borussia M'gladbach, Borussia Dortmund – 2014–
 Adnan Januzaj – Borussia Dortmund – 2015–16
 Vincent Kompany – Hamburger SV – 2006–09
 Michael Lejan – 1. FC Köln – 2003–04
 Christophe Lepoint – 1860 Munich – 2003–04
 Dodi Lukebakio – Fortuna Düsseldorf, Hertha BSC – 2018–
 Junior Malanda – VfL Wolfsburg – 2013–15
Orel Mangala – VfB Stuttgart – 2017–18, 2020–22
 Thomas Meunier – Borussia Dortmund – 2020–
 Émile Mpenza – Schalke 04, Hamburger SV – 1999–2003, 2004–06
 Vadis Odjidja-Ofoe – Hamburger SV – 2007–08
 Divock Origi – VfL Wolfsburg – 2017–18
 Jacky Peeters – Arminia Bielefeld – 1999–2000
 Jean-Marie Pfaff – Bayern Munich – 1982–88
 Gerard Plessers – Hamburger SV – 1984–88
 Sébastien Pocognoli – Hannover 96 – 2012–14
 Benito Raman – Fortuna Düsseldorf, Schalke 04 – 2018–21
 Bernd Rauw – Arminia Bielefeld – 2002–03, 2004–05
 Gunther Schepens – Karlsruher SC – 1997–98
 Timmy Simons – 1. FC Nürnberg – 2010–13
 Hugo Siquet – SC Freiburg – 2021–
 Wesley Sonck – Borussia M'gladbach – 2004–07
 Stéphane Stassin – Borussia M'gladbach – 2001–03
 Bernd Thijs – Borussia M'gladbach – 2004–07
 Daniel Van Buyten – Hamburger SV, Bayern Munich – 2004–14
 Jelle Van Damme – Werder Bremen – 2005–06
 Peter Van der Heyden – VfL Wolfsburg, Mainz 05 – 2005–08, 2009–10
 Roger Van Gool – 1. FC Köln – 1976–80
 Peter Van Houdt – Borussia M'gladbach, MSV Duisburg – 2001–04, 2005–06
 Joris Van Hout – Borussia M'gladbach, VfL Bochum – 2002–05, 2006–07
 Nico Van Kerckhoven – Schalke 04, Borussia M'gladbach – 1998–2005
 René Vandereycken – Blau-Weiß 90 Berlin – 1986–87
 Sven Vermant – Schalke 04 – 2001–05
 Birger Verstraete – 1. FC Köln – 2019–20
Aster Vranckx – VfL Wolfsburg – 2021–
 Stijn Vreven – 1. FC Kaiserslautern – 2003–04
 Marc Wilmots – Schalke 04 – 1996–2000, 2001–02
 Axel Witsel – Borussia Dortmund – 2018–22

Bosnia and Herzegovina
Until 1992 part of SFR Yugoslavia

 Bruno Akrapović – Energie Cottbus – 2000–03
 Zlatan Bajramović – FC St. Pauli, SC Freiburg, Schalke 04, Eintracht Frankfurt – 2001–02, 2003–10
 Sergej Barbarez – Hansa Rostock, Borussia Dortmund, Hamburger SV, Bayer Leverkusen – 1996–2008
 Muhamed Bešić – Hamburger SV – 2010–11
 Ermin Bičakčić – VfB Stuttgart, Eintracht Braunschweig, 1899 Hoffenheim – 2010–11, 2013–
 Marijan Ćavar – Eintracht Frankfurt – 2017–18
 Ermedin Demirović – SC Freiburg, Augsburg – 2020–
 Radomir Dubovina – Kickers Offenbach – 1983–84
 Edin Džeko – VfL Wolfsburg – 2007–11
 Vlatko Glavas – Fortuna Düsseldorf – 1995–97
 Ahmet Glavović – 1860 Munich – 1977–78
 Ivica Grlić – 1. FC Köln, MSV Duisburg – 2000–01, 2005–06, 2007–08
 Vladan Grujić – 1. FC Köln – 2003–04
 Benjamin Hadžić – Hannover 96 – 2018–19
 Izet Hajrović – Werder Bremen – 2014–15, 2016–18
 Idriz Hošić – 1. FC Kaiserslautern, MSV Duisburg – 1970–74
 Demir Hotić – Stuttgarter Kickers, VfB Stuttgart, 1. FC Kaiserslautern – 1988–93
 Mirko Hrgović – VfL Wolfsburg – 2003–05
 Faruk Hujdurović – Energie Cottbus – 2000–03
 Said Husejinović – Werder Bremen – 2008–11
 Vedad Ibišević – Alemannia Aachen, 1899 Hoffenheim, VfB Stuttgart, Hertha BSC, Schalke 04 – 2006–07, 2008–21
 Mato Jajalo – 1. FC Köln – 2010–12
 Zlatko Janjić – Arminia Bielefeld – 2008–09
 Murat Jašarević – MSV Duisburg – 1993–95
 Ivica Jozić – Wattenscheid 09 – 1993–94
 Sead Kajtaz – 1. FC Nürnberg – 1990–91
 Sead Kapetanović – VfL Wolfsburg, Borussia Dortmund – 1997–2001
 Kenan Kodro – Mainz 05 – 2017–18
 Sead Kolašinac – Schalke 04 – 2012–17, 2020–21
 Enver Marić – Schalke 04 – 1976–78
 Radmilo Mihajlović – Bayern Munich, Schalke 04, Eintracht Frankfurt – 1989–94
 Zvjezdan Misimović – Bayern Munich, VfL Bochum, 1. FC Nürnberg, VfL Wolfsburg – 2002–05, 2006–11
 Mensur Mujdža – SC Freiburg – 2009–15
 Predrag Pašić – VfB Stuttgart – 1985–87
 Tomislav Piplica – Energie Cottbus – 2000–03, 2006–08
 Ivan Radeljić – Energie Cottbus – 2007–09
 Sead Ramović – VfL Wolfsburg – 2001–04
 Aleksandar Ristić – Eintracht Braunschweig – 1974–78
 Hasan Salihamidžić – Hamburger SV, Bayern Munich, VfL Wolfsburg – 1995–2007, 2011–12
 Sejad Salihović – Hertha BSC, 1899 Hoffenheim, Hamburger SV – 2004–05, 2008–15, 2017–18
 Edhem Šljivo – 1. FC Köln – 1982–84
 Emir Spahić – Bayer Leverkusen, Hamburger SV – 2013–17
 Toni Šunjić – VfB Stuttgart – 2015–16
 Marko Topić – Energie Cottbus, VfL Wolfsburg – 2001–06
 Damir Vrančić – Mainz 05, Eintracht Braunschweig – 2006–07, 2013–14
 Mario Vrančić – Mainz 05, SC Paderborn, Darmstadt 98 – 2006–07, 2014–17
 Sead Zilić – Hertha BSC – 2000–01

Bulgaria

 Antonio Ananiev – 1. FC Köln – 1996–97
 Stanislav Angelov – Energie Cottbus – 2007–09
 Krasimir Balakov – VfB Stuttgart – 1995–2003
 Dimitar Berbatov – Bayer Leverkusen – 2000–06
 Alexandar Bonchev – MSV Duisburg – 1991–92
 Daniel Borimirov – 1860 Munich – 1995–2004
 Pavel Dochev – Hamburger SV – 1992–93
 Valeri Domovchiyski – Hertha BSC – 2007–10
 Georgi Donkov – VfL Bochum, 1. FC Köln – 1996–98, 2000–02
 Blagoy Georgiev – MSV Duisburg – 2007–08
 Ilia Gruev – Werder Bremen – 2020–21, 2022-
 Marian Hristov – 1. FC Kaiserslautern, VfL Wolfsburg – 1997–2007
 Petar Houbchev – Hamburger SV, Eintracht Frankfurt – 1993–97, 1998–2001
 Emil Kostadinov – Bayern Munich – 1994–96
 Yordan Letchkov – Hamburger SV – 1992–96
 Iliyan Mitsanski – 1. FC Kaiserslautern – 2010–11
 Aleksandar Mladenov – Hertha BSC – 2002–04
 Todor Nedelev – Mainz 05 – 2013–14
 Martin Petrov – VfL Wolfsburg – 2001–05
 Dimitar Rangelov – Energie Cottbus, Borussia Dortmund – 2007–11
 Stoycho Stoilov – 1. FC Nürnberg – 2001–02
 Tsanko Tsvetanov – Energie Cottbus – 2000–01
 Chavdar Yankov – Hannover 96 – 2005–09
 Zlatko Yankov – KFC Uerdingen – 1995–96
 Hristo Yovov – 1860 Munich – 1997–99
 Adalbert Zafirov – Arminia Bielefeld – 1997–98
 Martin Zafirov – Hamburger SV – 1997–98

Croatia
Until 1991 part of SFR Yugoslavia
 Andrija Anković – 1. FC Kaiserslautern – 1966–68
 Ilija Aračić – Hertha BSC – 1998–2000
 Slađan Ašanin – Borussia M'gladbach – 1998–99, 2001–04
 Marko Babić – Bayer Leverkusen, Hertha BSC – 2000–07, 2008–09
 Milan Badelj – Hamburger SV – 2012–15
 Ivica Banović – Werder Bremen, 1. FC Nürnberg, SC Freiburg – 2000–07, 2009–11
 Dion Drena Beljo – FC Augsburg – 2022–
 Leon Benko – 1. FC Nürnberg – 2006–08
 Miroslav Bičanić – Hansa Rostock, MSV Duisburg – 1996–97, 1998–99
 Slaven Bilić – Karlsruher SC – 1993–96
 Marino Biliškov – VfL Wolfsburg, MSV Duisburg – 1999–2006
 Nenad Bjelica – 1. FC Kaiserslautern – 2000–04
 Elvis Brajković – 1860 Munich – 1994–96
Josip Brekalo – VfL Wolfsburg, VfB Stuttgart – 2016–23
 Srećko Bogdan – Karlsruher SC – 1987–93
 Mario Boljat – Schalke 04 – 1979–80
 Luka Bonačić – VfL Bochum – 1979–80
 Tihomir Bulat – FC St. Pauli – 2001–02
 Ivan Buljan – Hamburger SV – 1977–81
 Damir Burić – Waldhof Mannheim, SC Freiburg – 1988–90, 1993–97, 1998–99
 Hrvoje Čale – VfL Wolfsburg – 2011–12
 Mario Carević – VfB Stuttgart – 2005–06
 Dragutin Čelić – Hertha BSC – 1990–91
 Antonio Čolak – 1. FC Nürnberg, Darmstadt 98 – 2013–14, 2016–17
 David Čolina – FC Augsburg – 2022–
 Vedran Ćorluka – Bayer Leverkusen – 2011–12
 Ante Čović – VfB Stuttgart, Hertha BSC, VfL Bochum – 1994–95, 1997–2001
 Zvjezdan Cvetković – Waldhof Mannheim – 1987–90
 Mario Cvitanović – Energie Cottbus – 2006–09
 Darko Dražić – Fortuna Düsseldorf – 1991–92, 1995–97
 Dino Drpić – Karlsruher SC – 2008–09
 Vilson Džoni – Schalke 04 – 1979–81
 Josip Elez – Hannover 96 – 2017–19
 Tomislav Erceg – MSV Duisburg – 1996–97
 Petar Filipović – FC St. Pauli – 2010–11
 Bartol Franjić – VfL Wolfsburg – 2022–
 Joško Gvardiol – RB Leipzig – 2021–
 Alen Halilović – Hamburger SV – 2016–17
 Ivo Iličević – VfL Bochum, 1. FC Kaiserslautern, Hamburger SV, 1. FC Nürnberg – 2006–08, 2010–16, 2018–19
 Kristijan Ipša – Energie Cottbus – 2007–08
 Kristijan Jakić – Eintracht Frankfurt – 2021–
 Tin Jedvaj – Bayer Leverkusen, FC Augsburg – 2014–21
 Josip Juranović – Union Berlin – 2022–
 Nikola Jurčević – SC Freiburg – 1995–97
 Vlado Kasalo – 1. FC Nürnberg – 1989–91

 Ivan Klasnić – Werder Bremen, Mainz 05 – 2001–08, 2012–13
 Fabijan Komljenović – Schalke 04 – 1993–94
 Niko Kovač – Bayer Leverkusen, Hamburger SV, Bayern Munich, Hertha BSC – 1996–2006
 Robert Kovač – Bayer Leverkusen, Bayern Munich, Borussia Dortmund – 1996–2005, 2007–09
 Marijan Kovačević – Hamburger SV, VfL Wolfsburg, MSV Duisburg, VfB Stuttgart – 1993–2000, 2008–09
 Vladimir Kovačić – Hamburger SV – 1974–75, 1976–77
 Andrej Kramarić – 1899 Hoffenheim – 2015–
 Dario Krešić – Bayer Leverkusen – 2015–16
 Davor Krznarić – Borussia M'gladbach – 1995–96
 Antun Labak – Energie Cottbus – 2000–02
 Srđan Lakić – Hertha BSC, 1. FC Kaiserslautern, VfL Wolfsburg, 1899 Hoffenheim, Eintracht Frankfurt, SC Paderborn – 2006–08, 2010–15
 Krešo Ljubičić – Eintracht Frankfurt – 2007–09
 Davor Lovren – Fortuna Düsseldorf – 2018–19
 Matej Maglica – VfB Stuttgart – 2021–
 Nikica Maglica – Dynamo Dresden – 1993–95
 Vladimir Maljković – Eintracht Frankfurt – 2000–01
 Zoran Mamić – VfL Bochum, Bayer Leverkusen – 1996–2001
 Mario Mandžukić – VfL Wolfsburg, Bayern Munich – 2010–14
 Marijo Marić – VfL Bochum, Arminia Bielefeld – 2000–01, 2004–05
 Tomislav Marić – Karlsruher SC, VfL Wolfsburg, Borussia M'gladbach – 1994–95, 2000–05
 Andre Mijatović – Arminia Bielefeld, Hertha BSC – 2007–09, 2011–12
 Mihael Mikić – 1. FC Kaiserslautern – 2004–06
 Stjepan Milardović – FC St. Pauli – 1977–78
 Zdenko Miletić – Arminia Bielefeld – 1996–98, 1999–2000
 Damir Milinović – VfL Bochum – 2000–01
 Ivica Mornar – Eintracht Frankfurt – 1995–96
 Petar Musa – Union Berlin – 2020–21
 Ivica Olić – Hertha BSC, Hamburger SV, Bayern Munich, VfL Wolfsburg – 1998–99, 2006–16
 Igor Pamić – Hansa Rostock – 1997–99
 Zvonko Pamić – SC Freiburg – 2010–11
 Andrej Panadić – Hamburger SV – 1997–2002
 Marco Pašalić – Borussia Dortmund – 2022–
 Ivan Paurević – Fortuna Düsseldorf – 2012–13
 Mateo Pavlović – Werder Bremen – 2012–13
 Ivan Perišić – Borussia Dortmund, VfL Wolfsburg, Bayern Munich – 2011–16, 2019–20
 Željko Perušić – 1860 Munich – 1965–70
 Mladen Petrić – Borussia Dortmund, Hamburger SV – 2007–12
 Alen Petrović – VfL Bochum – 1998–99
 Marko Pjaca – Schalke 04 – 2017–18
 Marin Pongračić – VfL Wolfsburg, Borussia Dortmund – 2019–22
 Mladen Pralija – Hamburger SV – 1987–88
 Danijel Pranjić – Bayern Munich – 2009–12
 Jurica Puljiz – Eintracht Frankfurt – 2003–04
 Ivan Rakitić – Schalke 04 – 2007–11
 Ante Rebić – Eintracht Frankfurt – 2016–20
 Stiven Rivić – Energie Cottbus, 1. FC Kaiserslautern – 2006–09, 2010–11
 Ivica Šangulin – Hertha BSC – 1968–69
 Ivan Santini – SC Freiburg – 2011–13
 Vlado Šarić – Rot-Weiss Essen – 1966–67
 Ivica Senzen – 1860 Munich – 1979–81
 Kujtim Shala – Fortuna Düsseldorf – 1995–96
 Josip Šimunić – Hamburger SV, Hertha BSC, 1899 Hoffenheim – 1997–98, 1999–2011
 Josip Skoblar – Hannover 96 – 1967–70
 Zlatko Škorić – VfB Stuttgart – 1971–72
 Petar Slišković – Mainz 05 – 2010–15
 Hrvoje Smolčić – Eintracht Frankfurt – 2022–
 Nikola Soldo – 1. FC Köln – 2022–
 Zvonimir Soldo – VfB Stuttgart – 1996–2006
 Željko Sopić – Borussia M'gladbach – 1998–99
 Borna Sosa – VfB Stuttgart – 2018–19, 2020–
 Jozo Stanić – FC Augsburg – 2018–19
 Josip Stanišić – Bayern Munich – 2020–
 Danijel Štefulj – Hannover 96 – 2002–05
 Davor Šuker – 1860 Munich – 2001–03
Ivan Šunjić – Hertha Berlin – 2022–
 Josip Tadić – Bayer Leverkusen – 2005–06
 Filip Tapalović – VfL Bochum, Schalke 04, 1860 Munich – 1996–97, 1998–2005
 Zoran Tomčić – VfL Wolfsburg – 1997–98
 Samir Toplak – VfL Bochum – 1998–99, 2000–01
Filip Uremović – Hertha Berlin – 2022–
 Miro Varvodić – 1. FC Köln – 2010–12
 Domagoj Vida – Bayer Leverkusen – 2010–11
 Gabriel Vidović – Bayern Munich – 2021–
 Jurica Vranješ – Bayer Leverkusen, VfB Stuttgart, Werder Bremen – 1999–2009
 Bojan Vručina – MSV Duisburg – 2007–08
 Goran Vučević – 1. FC Köln – 1997–98
 Robert Vujević – VfB Stuttgart – 2001–02
 Anton Vučkov – Bayern Munich – 1965–66
 Boris Živković – Bayer Leverkusen, VfB Stuttgart, 1. FC Köln – 1997–2006
 Ivan Žugčić – VfL Bochum – 1980–85, 1986–87

Cyprus
 Efstathios Aloneftis – Energie Cottbus – 2007–08
 Rainer Rauffmann – Eintracht Frankfurt, Arminia Bielefeld – 1995–97

Czech Republic
Until 1992 Czechoslovakia
Lukáš Ambros – VfL Wolfsburg – 2022–
 Miroslav Baranek – 1. FC Köln – 2000–02
 Patrik Berger – Borussia Dortmund – 1995–96
 Jiří Bílek – 1. FC Kaiserslautern – 2010–11
 Günter Bittengel – KFC Uerdingen – 1992–93, 1994–96
 Jaromír Blažek – 1. FC Nürnberg – 2007–08
 Pavel Chaloupka – Fortuna Düsseldorf – 1989–90
 Martin Čížek – 1860 Munich, SpVgg Unterhaching – 1998–2001
 Vladimír Darida – SC Freiburg, Hertha BSC – 2013–
 Pavel David – 1. FC Nürnberg – 2001–03
 Pavel Drsek – MSV Duisburg, VfL Bochum – 1999–2000, 2006–08
 Jaroslav Drobný – VfL Bochum, Hertha BSC, Hamburger SV, Werder Bremen, Fortuna Düsseldorf – 2006–17, 2018–19
 Martin Fenin – Eintracht Frankfurt – 2007–11
 Martin Frýdek – Bayer Leverkusen, MSV Duisburg – 1997–99
 Milan Fukal – Hamburger SV, Borussia M'gladbach – 2000–06
 Petr Gabriel – 1. FC Kaiserslautern, Arminia Bielefeld – 2001–02, 2004–08
 Tomáš Galásek – 1. FC Nürnberg, Borussia M'gladbach – 2006–09
 Theodor Gebre Selassie – Werder Bremen – 2012–21
 Pavel Hapal – Bayer Leverkusen – 1992–95
 Marek Heinz – Hamburger SV, Arminia Bielefeld, Borussia M'gladbach – 2000–03, 2004–06
Adam Hloušek – 1. FC Kaiserslautern, 1. FC Nürnberg, VfB Stuttgart – 2010–16
Adam Hložek – Bayer Leverkusen – 2022–
 Roman Hubník – Hertha BSC – 2009–10, 2011–12
 David Jarolím – Bayern Munich, 1. FC Nürnberg, Hamburger SV – 1998–99, 2001–12
 Petr Jiráček – VfL Wolfsburg, Hamburger SV – 2012–15
 Pavel Kadeřábek – 1899 Hoffenheim – 2015–
 Michal Kadlec – Bayer Leverkusen – 2008–13
 Miroslav Kadlec – 1. FC Kaiserslautern – 1990–96, 1997–98
 Václav Kadlec – Eintracht Frankfurt – 2013–16
 Jiří Kaufman – Hannover 96 – 2002–03, 2004–05
 Jan Kliment – VfB Stuttgart – 2015–16
 Ivo Knoflíček – FC St. Pauli, VfL Bochum – 1989–92
 David Kobylík – Arminia Bielefeld – 2005–08
 Jan Koller – Borussia Dortmund, 1. FC Nürnberg – 2001–06, 2007–08
 Tomáš Koubek – FC Augsburg – 2019–20
 Michal Kovář – Hansa Rostock – 2002–04
 Alex Král – Schalke 04 – 2022–
 Pavel Krmaš – SC Freiburg – 2009–15
 Luboš Kubík – 1. FC Nürnberg – 1993–94
 Radim Kučera – Arminia Bielefeld – 2005–09
 Pavel Kuka – 1. FC Kaiserslautern, 1. FC Nürnberg, VfB Stuttgart – 1993–96, 1997–2000
 Karel Kula – Stuttgarter Kickers, Wattenscheid 09 – 1991–94
 Jan Laštůvka – VfL Bochum – 2007–08
 Radoslav Látal – Schalke 04 – 1994–2001
 Martin Latka – Fortuna Düsseldorf – 2012–13
 Vratislav Lokvenc – 1. FC Kaiserslautern, VfL Bochum – 2000–05
 Pavel Mačák – Schalke 04 – 1984–85, 1986–87
 Oldřich Machala – Hansa Rostock – 1991–92
 Jan Morávek – Schalke 04, 1. FC Kaiserslautern, FC Augsburg – 2009–14, 2015–2022
 Jiří Němec – Schalke 04 – 1993–2002
 Marek Nikl – 1. FC Nürnberg – 1998–99, 2001–2003, 2004–07
 Pavel Novotný – VfL Wolfsburg – 1997–98
 Josef Obajdin – Eintracht Frankfurt – 1994–95
 Tomáš Ostrák – 1. FC Köln – 2021–22
 Michal Papadopulos – Bayer Leverkusen, Energie Cottbus – 2005–08
 Jiří Pavlenka – Werder Bremen – 2017–21, 2022-
 Tomáš Pekhart – 1. FC Nürnberg, FC Ingolstadt – 2011–14, 2015–16
 Ondřej Petrák – 1. FC Nürnberg – 2013–14, 2018–19
 Milan Petržela – FC Augsburg – 2012–13
 Václav Pilař – SC Freiburg – 2013–14
 Jan Polák – 1. FC Nürnberg, VfL Wolfsburg – 2005–07, 2010–14
 Zdeněk Pospěch – Mainz 05 – 2011–14
 Karel Rada – Eintracht Frankfurt – 2000–01
 Petr Rada – Fortuna Düsseldorf – 1989–90
 Jan Rajnoch – Energie Cottbus – 2008–09
 František Rajtoral – Hannover 96 – 2013–14
 Tomáš Rosický – Borussia Dortmund – 2000–06
 David Rozehnal – Hamburger SV – 2009–10
 Petr Ruman – Mainz 05 – 2005–07
Patrik Schick – RB Leipzig, Bayer Leverkusen – 2019–
 Roman Sedláček – Hansa Rostock – 1991–92
 Horst Siegl – 1. FC Kaiserslautern – 1995–96
 Jan Šimák – Bayer Leverkusen, Hannover 96, VfB Stuttgart, Mainz 05 – 2002–04, 2008–11
 Jan Šimůnek – VfL Wolfsburg, 1. FC Kaiserslautern – 2007–10, 2011–12
 Rudolf Skácel – Hertha BSC – 2007–08
 Jiří Štajner – Hannover 96 – 2002–10
 František Straka – Borussia M'gladbach, Hansa Rostock – 1988–92
 Marek Suchý – FC Augsburg – 2019–21
 Václav Svěrkoš – Borussia M'gladbach, Hertha BSC – 2003–07
 Filip Trojan – Schalke 04, VfL Bochum, Mainz 05 – 2002–05, 2006–07, 2009–10
 Roman Týce – 1860 Munich – 1998–2004
 Tomáš Ujfaluši – Hamburger SV – 2000–04
 Ivo Ulich – Borussia M'gladbach – 2001–05
 Kamil Vacek – Arminia Bielefeld – 2005–06
 Robert Vágner – Energie Cottbus – 2002–03
 Tomáš Votava – 1860 Munich – 1999–2003

Denmark
 Henrik Agerbeck – Hertha BSC – 1978–80
 Erik Bo Andersen – MSV Duisburg – 1998–2000
 Henrik Andersen – 1. FC Köln – 1990–98
 Leon Andreasen – Werder Bremen, Mainz 05, Hannover 96 – 2005–16
 Thomas Bælum – MSV Duisburg – 2005–06
 Patrick Banggaard – Darmstadt 98 – 2016–17
 Jacob Barrett Laursen – Arminia Bielefeld – 2020–22
 Jan Bartram – Bayer Uerdingen – 1988–91
 Lars Bastrup – Kickers Offenbach, Hamburger SV – 1975–76, 1981–83
 Uffe Bech – Hannover 96 – 2015–16, 2018–19
 Tommy Bechmann – VfL Bochum, SC Freiburg – 2004–05, 2006–08, 2009–10
 Nicklas Bendtner – VfL Wolfsburg – 2014–16
 Emil Berggreen – Mainz 05 – 2017–18
 Ole Bjørnmose – Werder Bremen, Hamburger SV – 1966–71, 1971–77
 Kasper Bøgelund – Borussia M'gladbach – 2005–07
 Lars Brøgger – Fortuna Düsseldorf – 1991–92
 Jacob Bruun Larsen – Borussia Dortmund, VfB Stuttgart, TSG 1899 Hoffenheim – 2017–
 Andreas Christensen – Borussia M'gladbach – 2015–17
 Bent Christensen – Schalke 04 – 1991–93
 Kim Christensen – Hamburger SV – 2001–03
Oliver Christensen – Hertha Berlin – 2022–
 Kim Christofte – 1. FC Köln – 1992–94
 Søren Colding – VfL Bochum – 2000–01, 2002–05
 Peter Dahl – Hannover 96 – 1973–74, 1975–76
 John Danielsen – Werder Bremen – 1965–70
 Thomas Delaney – Werder Bremen, Borussia Dortmund, TSG 1899 Hoffenheim  – 2016–21, 2023-
 Kasper Dolberg – 1899 Hoffenheim – 2022–
 Preben Elkjær – 1. FC Köln – 1976–77
Wahid Faghir – VfB Stuttgart – 2021–
 Ulrik le Fevre – Borussia M'gladbach – 1969–72
 Christian Flindt Bjerg – Karlsruher SC – 1994–95
 Ove Flindt Bjerg – Karlsruher SC – 1975–77
 Viktor Fischer – Mainz 05 – 2017–18
 Oscar Fraulo – Borussia M'gladbach – 2022–
 Jakob Friis-Hansen – Hamburger SV – 1996–97
 Bjarne Goldbæk – Schalke 04, 1. FC Kaiserslautern, 1. FC Köln – 1987–88, 1989–96
 Peter Graulund – VfL Bochum – 2002–03
 Thomas Gravesen – Hamburger SV – 1997–2000
 Michael Gravgaard – Hamburger SV – 2008–09
 Jesper Grønkjær – VfB Stuttgart – 2005–06
 Allan Hansen – Hamburger SV – 1982–84
 Johnny Hansen – 1. FC Nürnberg, Bayern Munich – 1968–69, 1970–76
 Martin Hansen – FC Ingolstadt – 2016–17
 Jan Heintze – KFC Uerdingen, Bayer Leverkusen – 1994–99
 Thomas Helveg – Borussia M'gladbach – 2005–07
 Pierre-Emile Højbjerg – Bayern Munich, FC Augsburg, Schalke 04 – 2013–16
 Ken Ilsø – Fortuna Düsseldorf – 2012–13
 Marcus Ingvartsen – Union Berlin, Mainz 05 – 2019–
 Lars Jacobsen – Hamburger SV – 2002–04
 Bent Jensen – Eintracht Braunschweig – 1972–73
 Daniel Jensen – Werder Bremen – 2004–11
 Henning Jensen – Borussia M'gladbach – 1972–76
 Jann Jensen – 1. FC Köln, VfL Wolfsburg – 1988–93, 1997–98
 John Jensen – Hamburger SV – 1988–90
 Niclas Jensen – Borussia Dortmund – 2003–05
 Viggo Jensen – Bayern Munich – 1973–74
 Allan Jepsen – Hamburger SV – 1997–99
 Leon Jessen – 1. FC Kaiserslautern – 2010–12
 Bo Elvar Jørgensen – Waldhof Mannheim – 1986–88
 Mathias Jørgensen – Fortuna Düsseldorf – 2019–20
 Nicolai Jørgensen – Bayer Leverkusen – 2010–12
 Thomas Kahlenberg – VfL Wolfsburg – 2009–11, 2012–13
 Jonas Kamper – Arminia Bielefeld – 2006–09
 Simon Kjær – VfL Wolfsburg – 2010–13
 Jørgen Kristensen – Hertha BSC – 1976–78
 Jan Kristiansen – 1. FC Nürnberg – 2005–08
 William Kvist – VfB Stuttgart – 2011–14
 Søren Larsen – Schalke 04 – 2005–08
 Brian Laudrup – Bayer Uerdingen, Bayern Munich – 1989–92
 Søren Lerby – Bayern Munich – 1983–86
 Jesper Lindstrøm – Eintracht Frankfurt – 2021–
 Jonas Lössl – Mainz 05 – 2016–17
 Peter Løvenkrands – Schalke 04 – 2006–08
 Michael Lumb – SC Freiburg – 2011–12
 Flemming Lund – Rot-Weiss Essen, Fortuna Düsseldorf – 1976–79
 Lars Lunde – Bayern Munich – 1986–88
 Kim Madsen – VfL Wolfsburg, Hansa Rostock – 2002–05
 Michael Madsen – VfL Wolfsburg – 2001–02
 Peter Madsen – VfL Wolfsburg, VfL Bochum, 1. FC Köln – 2002–06
 Allan Michaelsen – Eintracht Braunschweig – 1972–73
 Tobias Mikkelsen – Greuther Fürth – 2012–13
 Johnny Mølby – Borussia M'gladbach – 1992–94
Nikolas Nartey – 1. FC Köln, VfB Stuttgart – 2017–18, 2021–
 Ole Møller Nielsen – VfL Bochum – 1986–87
 Alex Nielsen – Schalke 04 – 1987–88
 Allan Nielsen – Bayern Munich – 1990–91
 Carsten Nielsen – Borussia M'gladbach – 1976–81
 David Nielsen – Fortuna Düsseldorf – 1996–97
 Jan-Hoiland Nielsen – 1860 Munich – 1977–78
Kristian Pedersen – 1. FC Köln – 2022–
 Peter Nielsen – Borussia M'gladbach – 1992–97, 2001–02
 Morten Olsen – 1. FC Köln – 1986–89
 Kristian Pedersen – 1. FC Köln – 2022–
 Per Pedersen – Borussia M'gladbach – 1997–98
 Christian Poulsen – Schalke 04 – 2002–06
 Kaj Poulsen – Hannover 96 – 1966–68
 Niels Poulsen – 1860 Munich – 1979–80
 Yussuf Poulsen – RB Leipzig – 2016–
 Flemming Povlsen – 1. FC Köln, Borussia Dortmund – 1987–95
 David Rasmussen – Hansa Rostock – 2004–05
 Morten Rasmussen – Mainz 05 – 2010–11
 Ole Rasmussen – Hertha BSC – 1975–80, 1982–83
 Peter Rasmussen – VfB Stuttgart – 1989–91
 Thomas Rasmussen – Hansa Rostock – 2003–05
 Henrik Ravn – Fortuna Düsseldorf – 1986–87
 Henrik Risom – Dynamo Dresden – 1993–95
 Frederik Rønnow – Eintracht Frankfurt, Schalke 04, Union Berlin – 2018–
 Per Røntved – Werder Bremen – 1972–79
 Thomas Rytter – VfL Wolfsburg – 2001–05
 Ebbe Sand – Schalke 04 – 1999–2006
 Michael Schjønberg – 1. FC Kaiserslautern – 1997–2001
 Kjell Seneca – Bayern Munich – 1975–77
 Zidan Sertdemir – Bayer Leverkusen – 2021–
 Allan Simonsen – Borussia M'gladbach – 1972–79
 Morten Skoubo – Borussia M'gladbach – 2002–04
 Robert Skov – 1899 Hoffenheim – 2019–
 Peter Skov-Jensen – VfL Bochum – 2004–05, 2006–07
 Dennis Sørensen – Energie Cottbus – 2007–09
 Frederik Sørensen – 1. FC Köln – 2015–18, 2020–21
 Ole Sørensen – 1. FC Köln – 1965–66
 Jens Stage – Werder Bremen – 2022–
 Jens Steffensen – Bayer Uerdingen, Arminia Bielefeld – 1979-82
 Mark Strudal – Borussia Dortmund – 1988–89
 Kevin Stuhr Ellegaard – Hertha BSC – 2006–07
 Sebastian Svärd – Borussia M'gladbach – 2006–07, 2008–09
 Bo Svensson – Borussia M'gladbach, Mainz 05 – 2005–07, 2009–14
 Claus Thomsen – VfL Wolfsburg – 1998–2001
 Steen Thychosen – Borussia M'gladbach – 1978–81
 Mikkel Thygesen – Borussia M'gladbach – 2006–07
 Poul-Erik Thygesen – Werder Bremen – 1973–75
 Stig Tøfting – Hamburger SV, MSV Duisburg – 1993–95, 1997–2002
 Jon Dahl Tomasson – VfB Stuttgart – 2005–07
 Jonas Troest – Hannover 96 – 2005–07
 Niels Tune-Hansen – FC St. Pauli – 1977–78
 Mads Valentin – FC Augsburg – 2019–
 Jannik Vestergaard – 1899 Hoffenheim, Werder Bremen, Borussia M'gladbach – 2010–18
Jonas Wind – VfL Wolfsburg – 2021–
Frederik Winther – FC Augsburg – 2021–
Niki Zimling – Mainz 05 – 2012–14

England
 Lewis Baker – Fortuna Düsseldorf – 2019–20
 Jude Bellingham – Borussia Dortmund – 2020–
 Keanan Bennetts – Borussia M'gladbach – 2019–20, 2021–22
 Lee Buchanan – Werder Bremen – 2022–
 Jamie Bynoe-Gittens – Borussia Dortmund – 2021–
 Mandela Egbo – Borussia M'gladbach – 2017–18
 Antony Evans – SC Paderborn – 2019–20
 Mark Farrington – Hertha BSC – 1990–91
 Demarai Gray – Bayer Leverkusen – 2020–21
 Owen Hargreaves – Bayern Munich – 2000–07
 Kaylen Hinds — VfL Wolfsburg — 2017–18
 Peter Hobday – Hannover 96, Eintracht Frankfurt, Arminia Bielefeld – 1987–90, 1996–97
 Callum Hudson-Odoi – Bayer Leverkusen – 2022–
 Kevin Keegan – Hamburger SV – 1977–80
Jonjoe Kenny – Schalke 04, Hertha BSC – 2019–20, 2022-
 Ryan Kent – SC Freiburg – 2017–18
 Michael Mancienne – Hamburger SV – 2011–14
 Clinton Mola – VfB Stuttgart – 2021–
 Reiss Nelson – 1899 Hoffenheim – 2018–19
Felix Nmecha – VfL Wolfsburg – 2021–
 Reece Oxford – Borussia M'gladbach, FC Augsburg – 2017–
 Jordi Osei-Tutu – Bochum – 2022–
 Omar Richards – Bayern Munich – 2021–22
 Jadon Sancho – Borussia Dortmund – 2017–21
 Ryan Sessegnon – 1899 Hoffenheim – 2020–21
 Emile Smith Rowe – RB Leipzig – 2018–19
 Dave Watson – Werder Bremen – 1979–80
 Tony Woodcock – 1. FC Köln – 1979–82, 1986–88

Estonia
 Ragnar Klavan – FC Augsburg – 2012–16

Faroe Islands
 Jóan Símun Edmundsson – Arminia Bielefeld – 2020–21

Finland
 Mikael Forssell – Borussia M'gladbach, Hannover 96 – 2002–03, 2008–11
 Ari Hjelm – Stuttgarter Kickers – 1988–89
 Lukáš Hrádecký – Eintracht Frankfurt, Bayer Leverkusen – 2015–
 Sami Hyypiä – Bayer Leverkusen – 2009–11
 Olli Isoaho – Arminia Bielefeld – 1982–83
 Fredrik Jensen – FC Augsburg – 2018–
 Joonas Kolkka – Borussia M'gladbach – 2003–04
 Pekka Lagerblom – Werder Bremen, 1. FC Nürnberg – 2003–06
 Kari Laukkanen – Stuttgarter Kickers – 1988–89
 Jari Litmanen – Hansa Rostock – 2004–05
 Niklas Moisander – Werder Bremen – 2016–21
 Mika Nurmela – 1. FC Kaiserslautern – 2003–05
 Petri Pasanen – Werder Bremen – 2004–11
 Juhani Peltonen – Hamburger SV – 1964–66
 Joel Pohjanpalo – Bayer Leverkusen, Union Berlin – 2016–18, 2019–23
 Teemu Pukki – Schalke 04 – 2011–14
 Seppo Pyykkö – Bayer Uerdingen – 1980–81
 Jukka Raitala – 1899 Hoffenheim – 2009–10
 Pasi Rautiainen – Bayern Munich, Werder Bremen, Arminia Bielefeld – 1980–85
 Alexander Ring – Borussia M'gladbach – 2011–13
 Janne Saarinen – 1860 Munich – 2003–04
 Berat Sadik – Arminia Bielefeld – 2008–09
 Jere Uronen – Schalke 04 – 2022–

France
 Jacques Abardonado – 1. FC Nürnberg – 2007–08
 Amine Adli – Bayer Leverkusen – 2021–
 Naouirou Ahamada – VfB Stuttgart – 2020–
 Ludovic Ajorque – Mainz 05 – 2022–
 Johan Audel – VfB Stuttgart – 2010–11
 Jean-Kévin Augustin – RB Leipzig – 2017–19
 Abdourahmane Barry – Greuther Fürth – 2021–22
 Christian Bassila – Energie Cottbus – 2007–08
 Mathieu Béda – 1. FC Kaiserslautern – 2005–06
 Marc Berdoll – 1. FC Saarbrücken – 1976–77
 Romain Brégerie – FC Ingolstadt – 2015–17
 Jimmy Briand – Hannover 96 – 2014–15
 Gaëtan Bussmann – Mainz 05 – 2015–17, 2018–19
Anthony Caci – Mainz 05 – 2022–
 Irvin Cardona – FC Augsburg – 2022–
 Kingsley Coman – Bayern Munich – 2015–
 Francis Coquelin – SC Freiburg – 2013–14
 Tanguy Coulibaly – VfB Stuttgart – 2020–
Michaël Cuisance – Borussia M'gladbach, Bayern Munich – 2017–22
 Matthieu Delpierre – VfB Stuttgart, 1899 Hoffenheim – 2004–13
 Ousmane Dembélé – Borussia Dortmund – 2016–17
 Moussa Diaby – Bayer Leverkusen – 2019–
 Éric Junior Dina Ebimbe – Eintracht Frankfurt – 2022–
 Salim Djefaflia – Hannover 96 – 2003–04
 Youri Djorkaeff – 1. FC Kaiserslautern – 1999–2002
 Régis Dorn – SC Freiburg, Hansa Rostock – 2000–02, 2004–05, 2007–08
 Mamadou Doucouré – Borussia M'gladbach – 2019–20
 Fabrice Ehret – 1. FC Köln – 2008–11
 Hubert Fournier – Borussia M'gladbach – 1996–98
 Angelo Fulgini – 1. FSV Mainz 05 – 2022–
 Ronaël Pierre-Gabriel – Mainz 05 – 2019–20
 Gilbert Gress – VfB Stuttgart – 1966–71
 Mattéo Guendouzi – Hertha BSC – 2020–21
 Josuha Guilavogui – VfL Wolfsburg – 2014–
 Patrick Guillou – VfL Bochum – 1990–93
 Gérard Hausser – Karlsruher SC – 1967–68
 Lucas Hernandez – Bayern Munich – 2019–
 Valérien Ismaël – Werder Bremen, Bayern Munich, Hannover 96 – 2003–09
 Jonathan Jäger – SC Freiburg – 2009–11
 Jean-Sébastien Jaurès – Borussia M'gladbach – 2008–10
 Christopher Jullien – SC Freiburg – 2014–15
 Wilfried Kanga – Hertha BSC – 2022–
 Mamoudou Karamoko – VfL Wolfsburg – 2019–20
 Marc Keller – Karlsruher SC – 1996–98
 Randal Kolo Muani – Eintracht Frankfurt – 2022–
 Timothée Kolodziejczak – Borussia M'gladbach – 2016–17
 Ibrahima Konaté – RB Leipzig – 2017–21
 Kouadio Koné – Borussia M'gladbach – 2021–
 Jean-François Kornetzky – Karlsruher SC – 2007–09
 Vincent Koziello – 1. FC Köln – 2017–18
 Gaëtan Krebs – Hannover 96 – 2007–09
 Maxence Lacroix – VfL Wolfsburg – 2020–
 Charles-Elie Laprevotte – SC Freiburg – 2013–14
 Lilian Laslandes – 1. FC Köln – 2001–02
 Bryan Lasme – Arminia Bielefeld – 2021–22
 Damien Le Tallec – Borussia Dortmund – 2009–10
 Bixente Lizarazu – Bayern Munich – 1997–2006
 Anthony Losilla – VfL Bochum – 2021–
 Myziane Maolida – Hertha BSC – 2021–
 Steve Marlet – VfL Wolfsburg – 2005–06
 Jean-Philippe Mateta – Mainz 05 – 2018–21
 Nathanaël Mbuku – FC Augsburg – 2022–
 Johan Micoud – Werder Bremen – 2002–06
 Enzo Millot – VfB Stuttgart – 2021–
 Anthony Modeste – 1899 Hoffenheim, 1. FC Köln, Borussia Dortmund – 2013–17, 2019–
 Florent Mollet – Schalke 04 – 2022–
 Nordi Mukiele – RB Leipzig – 2018–22
 Evan Ndicka – Eintracht Frankfurt – 2018–
 Nathan Ngoumou – Borussia M'gladbach – 2022–
 Tanguy Nianzou – Bayern Munich – 2020–22
 Christopher Nkunku – RB Leipzig – 2019–
 Stanley Nsoki - TSG Hoffenheim - 2022-
 Jean-Pierre Papin – Bayern Munich – 1994–96
 Benjamin Pavard – VfB Stuttgart, Bayern Munich – 2017–
 Marc Pfertzel – VfL Bochum – 2007–10
 Alassane Pléa – Borussia M'gladbach – 2018–
 Nicolas Plestan – Schalke 04 – 2010–11
 Simon Pouplin – SC Freiburg – 2009–11
 Abder Ramdane – Hansa Rostock, SC Freiburg – 1998–2002
 Yoric Ravet – SC Freiburg – 2017–19
 Franck Ribéry – Bayern Munich – 2007–19
 Jérôme Roussillon – VfL Wolfsburg – 2018–
 Georginio Rutter – 1899 Hoffenheim – 2020–
 Willy Sagnol – Bayern Munich – 2000–08
 Allan Saint-Maximin – Hannover 96 – 2015–16
 Baptiste Santamaria – SC Freiburg – 2020–22
 Jonathan Schmid – SC Freiburg, 1899 Hoffenheim, FC Augsburg – 2010–
Kiliann Sildillia – SC Freiburg – 2021–
 Mikaël Silvestre – Werder Bremen – 2010–12
 Mohamed Simakan – RB Leipzig – 2021–
 Didier Six – VfB Stuttgart – 1981–83
 Benjamin Stambouli – Schalke 04 – 2016–21
 Mathys Tel – Bayern Munich – 2022–
 Marcus Thuram – Borussia M'gladbach – 2019–
 Alexis Tibidi – VfB Stuttgart – 2021–22
 Jean-Clair Todibo – Schalke 04 – 2019–20
Corentin Tolisso – Bayern Munich – 2017–22
 Lucas Tousart – Hertha BSC – 2020–
 Dayot Upamecano – RB Leipzig, Bayern Munich – 2016–
 Olivier Veigneau – MSV Duisburg – 2007–08
 Guillaume Warmuz – Borussia Dortmund – 2003–05
 Dan-Axel Zagadou – Borussia Dortmund – 2017–22
 David Zitelli – Karlsruher SC – 1997–98

Georgia
 Archil Arveladze – 1. FC Köln – 2000–02
 Revaz Arveladze – 1. FC Köln – 1993–94
 Aleksandr Iashvili – SC Freiburg, Karlsruher SC – 1998–2002, 2003–05, 2007–09
 Levan Kenia – Schalke 04 – 2008–10
 Otar Khizaneishvili – SC Freiburg – 2004–05
 Levan Kobiashvili – SC Freiburg, Schalke 04, Hertha BSC – 1998–2002, 2003–10, 2011–12, 2013–14
 David Targamadze – SC Freiburg – 2009–10
 Kakhaber Tskhadadze – Eintracht Frankfurt – 1992–96
 Levan Tskitishvili – SC Freiburg, VfL Wolfsburg – 1998–2002, 2003–06

Greece
 Ioannis Amanatidis – VfB Stuttgart, Eintracht Frankfurt, 1. FC Kaiserslautern – 2002–11
 Chrissovalantis Anagnostou – Borussia M'gladbach – 1997–99
 Angelos Charisteas – Werder Bremen, 1. FC Nürnberg, Bayer Leverkusen, Schalke 04 – 2002–05, 2007–11
 Dimitrios Daras – Werder Bremen – 1975–78
 Anastasios Donis – VfB Stuttgart – 2017–19
 Kostas Fortounis – 1. FC Kaiserslautern – 2011–12
 Maik Galakos – Fortuna Düsseldorf – 1972–73
 Theofanis Gekas – VfL Bochum, Bayer Leverkusen, Hertha BSC, Eintracht Frankfurt – 2006–11
 Dimitrios Grammozis – Hamburger SV, 1. FC Kaiserslautern, 1. FC Köln – 1998–2006
 Minas Hantzidis – Bayer Leverkusen, VfL Bochum – 1985–88
 Leonidas Kampantais – Arminia Bielefeld – 2007–08
 Stefanos Kapino – Mainz 05, Werder Bremen – 2014–15, 2018–20
 Efthimios Kompodietas – Arminia Bielefeld – 1983–84
 Kostas Konstantinidis – Hertha BSC, Hannover 96 – 1999–2004
 Sotirios Kyrgiakos – Eintracht Frankfurt, VfL Wolfsburg – 2006–08, 2011–13
 Vasilis Lampropoulos – VfL Bochum – 2021–
 Nikos Liberopoulos – Eintracht Frankfurt – 2008–10
 Dimitris Limnios – 1. FC Köln – 2020–
 Stelios Malezas – Fortuna Düsseldorf – 2012–13
 Vangelis Mantzios – Eintracht Frankfurt – 2007–08
 Konstantinos Mavropanos – VfB Stuttgart – 2020–
 Dimitrios Moutas – Stuttgarter Kickers, VfL Bochum – 1991–93
 Fotios Papadopoulos – VfL Bochum – 1973–74
 Kyriakos Papadopoulos – Schalke 04, Bayer Leverkusen, RB Leipzig, Hamburger SV – 2010–18
 Sokratis Papastathopoulos – Werder Bremen, Borussia Dortmund – 2011–18
 Vasilios Pavlidis – Schalke 04 – 2020–21
 Athanasios Petsos – Bayer Leverkusen, 1. FC Kaiserslautern, Greuther Fürth, Werder Bremen – 2009–13, 2016–17
 Vasileios Pliatsikas – Schalke 04 – 2009–11
 Panagiotis Retsos – Bayer Leverkusen – 2017–18, 2019–20, 2021–22
 Paschalis Seretis – SC Freiburg – 1993–97
 Kostas Stafylidis – Bayer Leverkusen, FC Augsburg, 1899 Hoffenheim, VfL Bochum – 2013–14, 2015–20, 2021–
 Dimitrios Tsionanis – Waldhof Mannheim – 1983–90
 Pantelis Tsionanis – Waldhof Mannheim – 1983–84
 Georgios Tzavellas – Eintracht Frankfurt – 2010–11
 Alexandros Tziolis – Werder Bremen – 2008–09
 Sebastian Vasiliadis – SC Paderborn – 2019–20
 Odisseas Vlachodimos – VfB Stuttgart – 2015–16
 Panagiotis Vlachodimos – FC Augsburg – 2013–14

Hungary
 Bálint Bajner – Borussia Dortmund – 2012–13
 Tamás Bódog – SSV Ulm, Mainz 05 – 1999–2000, 2004–06
 Pál Dárdai – Hertha BSC – 1997–2010
 Palkó Dárdai – Hertha BSC – 2017–19
 Lajos Détári – Eintracht Frankfurt – 1987–88
 Tibor Dombi – Eintracht Frankfurt – 1999–2000
 László Farkasházy – VfL Bochum – 1989–90
 Péter Gulácsi – RB Leipzig – 2016–
 Tamás Hajnal – Schalke 04, Karlsruher SC, Borussia Dortmund, VfB Stuttgart – 1999–2000, 2007–13
 Ferenc Horváth – Energie Cottbus – 2000–01
 János Hrutka – 1. FC Kaiserslautern – 1997–2000
 Szabolcs Huszti – Hannover 96, Eintracht Frankfurt – 2006–09, 2012–14, 2015–17
 Gábor Király – Hertha BSC – 1997–2004
 László Kleinheisler – Werder Bremen, Darmstadt 98 – 2015–17
 György Kottán – Bayer Uerdingen – 1975–76
 Tamás Krivitz – Wuppertaler SV – 1974–75
 Krisztián Lisztes – VfB Stuttgart, Werder Bremen, Borussia M'gladbach – 1996–2006
 Zsolt Lőw – Energie Cottbus, 1899 Hoffenheim, Mainz 05 – 2002–03, 2008–10
 János Mátyus – Energie Cottbus – 2000–02
 Vasile Miriuță – Energie Cottbus – 2000–03
 Antal Nagy – Wuppertaler SV – 1974–75
Soma Novothny – VfL Bochum – 2021–22
Willi Orban – RB Leipzig – 2016–
 István Pisont – Eintracht Frankfurt – 1998–99
 Roland Sallai – SC Freiburg – 2018–
 András Schäfer – Union Berlin – 2021–
 Vilmos Sebők – Energie Cottbus – 2000–03
 Zoltán Stieber – Mainz 05, Greuther Fürth, Hamburger SV – 2011–13, 2014–16
 Imre Szabics – VfB Stuttgart, 1. FC Köln, Mainz 05 – 2003–07
 Ádám Szalai – Mainz 05, Schalke 04, 1899 Hoffenheim, Hannover 96 – 2009–22
 Zoltán Szélesi – Energie Cottbus – 2006–08
 Dominik Szoboszlai – RB Leipzig – 2021–
 Krisztián Szollár – Schalke 04 – 1999–2000
 István Sztáni – Eintracht Frankfurt – 1965–68
 Lajos Szűcs – 1. FC Kaiserslautern – 1997–98
 Attila Tököli – 1. FC Köln – 2005–06
 József Török – Waldhof Mannheim – 1985–87
 Gyula Tóth – Schalke 04, 1. FC Nürnberg – 1964–68
 József Varga – Greuther Fürth – 2012–13
 Zoltán Varga – Hertha BSC – 1970–72
 Ottó Vincze – Energie Cottbus – 2001–02

Iceland
 Magnús Bergs – Borussia Dortmund, Eintracht Braunschweig – 1980–81, 1984–85
 Atli Edvaldsson – Borussia Dortmund, Fortuna Düsseldorf, Bayer Uerdingen – 1980–88
 Alfreð Finnbogason – FC Augsburg – 2015–22
 Samúel Kári Friðjónsson – SC Paderborn – 2019–20
 Bjarni Guðjónsson – VfL Bochum – 2003–04
 Thordur Gudjonsson – VfL Bochum – 1994–95, 1996–97, 2002–05
 Larus Gudmundsson – Bayer Uerdingen, 1. FC Kaiserslautern – 1984–88
 Pétur Ormslev – Fortuna Düsseldorf – 1981–84
 Gylfi Sigurðsson – 1899 Hoffenheim – 2010–12
 Helgi Sigurðsson – VfB Stuttgart – 1994–95
 Ásgeir Sigurvinsson – Bayern Munich, VfB Stuttgart – 1981–90
 Eyjólfur Sverrisson – VfB Stuttgart, Hertha BSC – 1989–94, 1997–2003
 Gunnar Thorvaldsson – Hannover 96 – 2006–07

Israel
 Gal Alberman – Borussia M'gladbach – 2008–09
 Almog Cohen – 1. FC Nürnberg, FC Ingolstadt – 2010–13, 2015–17
 Roberto Colautti – Borussia M'gladbach – 2008–10
Mu'nas Dabbur – 1899 Hoffenheim – 2019–
 Ilay Elmkies – 1899 Hoffenheim – 2019–20
 David Pizanti – 1. FC Köln – 1985–87
 Shmuel Rosenthal – Borussia M'gladbach – 1972–73
 Itay Shechter – 1. FC Kaiserslautern – 2011–12
 Taleb Tawatha – Eintracht Frankfurt – 2016–19
 Gil Vermouth – 1. FC Kaiserslautern – 2011–12

Italy

 Federico Barba – VfB Stuttgart – 2015–16
 Andrea Barzagli – VfL Wolfsburg – 2008–11
 Roberto Forbicia – St. Pauli – 2011–14
 Luca Caldirola – Werder Bremen, Darmstadt 98 – 2013–18
 Daniel Caligiuri – SC Freiburg, VfL Wolfsburg, Schalke 04, FC Augsburg – 2009–
 Mauro Camoranesi – VfB Stuttgart – 2010–11
 Giuseppe Catizone – VfB Stuttgart – 1999–2000
 Fabio Chiarodia – Werder Bremen – 2022–
 Giulio Donati – Bayer Leverkusen, Mainz 05 – 2013–19
 Vincenzo Grifo – 1899 Hoffenheim, SC Freiburg, Borussia M'Gladbach – 2012–13, 2016–
 Ciro Immobile – Borussia Dortmund – 2014–15
 Federico Macheda – VfB Stuttgart – 2012–13
 Mattia Maggio – Hamburger SV – 2013–14
 Cristian Molinaro – VfB Stuttgart – 2009–14
 Massimo Oddo – Bayern Munich – 2008–09
 Luca Pellegrini – Eintracht Frankfurt – 2022–
 Ruggiero Rizzitelli – Bayern Munich – 1996–98
 Jacopo Sala – Hamburger SV – 2011–13
 Raffael Tonello – Fortuna Düsseldorf – 1995–97
 Luca Toni – Bayern Munich – 2007–10
 Luciano Velardi – VfL Bochum – 2002–03
 Kelvin Yeboah – FC Augsburg – 2022–
 Cristian Zaccardo – VfL Wolfsburg – 2008–10

Kazakhstan
 Konstantin Engel – FC Ingolstadt – 2015–16
 Sergei Karimov – VfL Wolfsburg – 2007–09
 Peter Neustädter – Karlsruher SC – 1992–94
 Heinrich Schmidtgal – Greuther Fürth – 2012–13

Kosovo
Until 1992 part of SFR Yugoslavia, from 1992 to 2003 part of FR Yugoslavia, from 2003 to 2006 part of Serbia and Montenegro, from 2006 to  part of Serbia
 Donis Avdijaj – Schalke 04 – 2016–18
 Ilir Azemi – Greuther Fürth – 2012–13
 Besart Berisha – Hamburger SV – 2006–07
 Valon Berisha – Fortuna Düsseldorf – 2019–20
 Albert Bunjaku – 1. FC Nürnberg – 2009–12
 Arianit Ferati – VfB Stuttgart – 2015–16
 Blendi Idrizi – Schalke 04 – 2020–21
 Fahrudin Jusufi – Eintracht Frankfurt – 1966–70
 Alban Meha – SC Paderborn – 2014–15
 Florent Muslija – Hannover 96 – 2018–19
 Fanol Përdedaj – Hertha BSC – 2011–12
 Milot Rashica – Werder Bremen – 2017–21
 Valmir Sulejmani – Hannover 96 – 2013–14, 2015–16
 Faton Toski – Eintracht Frankfurt – 2006–09

Latvia
 Artjoms Rudņevs – Hamburger SV, Hannover 96, 1. FC Köln – 2012–17

Liechtenstein
 Sandro Wieser – 1899 Hoffenheim – 2011–12

Lithuania
 Valdas Ivanauskas – Hamburger SV – 1993–97
 Marius Stankevičius – Hannover 96 – 2014–15
 Gintaras Staučė – MSV Duisburg – 1997–2000

Luxembourg
 Leandro Barreiro – Mainz 05 – 2018–
 Yvandro Borges Sanches – Borussia M'gladbach – 2022–
 Robby Langers – Borussia M'gladbach – 1980–
 Nico Braun – Schalke 04 – 1971–73
 Manuel Cardoni – Bayer Leverkusen – 1996–97
 Laurent Jans – SC Paderborn – 2019–20
 Robby Langers – Borussia M'gladbach – 1980–82
 Mathias Olesen – 1. FC Köln – 2021–
 Jeff Strasser – 1. FC Kaiserslautern, Borussia M'gladbach – 1999–2006

Malta
 Michael Mifsud – 1. FC Kaiserslautern – 2001–03

Moldova
 Alexandru Curtianu – Hamburger SV – 1998–99
 Alexandru Popovici – MSV Duisburg – 1997–98

Montenegro
Until 1992 part of SFR Yugoslavia, from 1992 to 2003 part of FR Yugoslavia, from 2003 to 2006 part of Serbia and Montenegro
 Dragan Bogavac – Mainz 05 – 2009–10
 Đorđije Ćetković – Hansa Rostock – 2007–08
 Radomir Đalović – Arminia Bielefeld – 2004–06
 Zdravko Drinčić – VfL Bochum – 1998–99, 2000–01
 Vanja Grubač – Hamburger SV – 1998–2000
Stevan Jovetić – Hertha BSC – 2021–
 Sanibal Orahovac – Karlsruher SC – 2007–08
 Savo Pavićević – Energie Cottbus – 2008–09
 Zvezdan Pejović – Fortuna Düsseldorf – 1995–96
 Milorad Peković – Mainz 05, Greuther Fürth – 2005–07, 2009–10, 2012–13
 Mirnes Pepić – SC Paderborn – 2014–15
 Branko Rašović – Borussia Dortmund – 1969–72

Netherlands

 Ibrahim Afellay – Schalke 04 – 2012–13
 Berthil ter Avest – Borussia M'gladbach – 2001–02
 Ryan Babel – 1899 Hoffenheim – 2010–12
Mitchel Bakker – Bayer Leverkusen – 2021–
 Riechedly Bazoer – VfL Wolfsburg – 2016–18
 Roy Beerens – Hertha BSC – 2014–16
 Charlison Benschop – Hannover 96 – 2015–16, 2017–18
 Sepp van den Berg – Schalke 04 – 2022–
 Daley Blind – Bayern Munich – 2022–
 Jean-Paul Boëtius – Mainz 05, Hertha BSC – 2018–
 Melayro Bogarde – 1899 Hoffenheim – 2019–21
 Mark van Bommel – Bayern Munich – 2006–11
 Solomon Bonnah – RB Leipzig – 2021–
 Peter Bosz – Hansa Rostock – 1997–98
 Khalid Boulahrouz – Hamburger SV, VfB Stuttgart – 2004–06, 2008–12
 Edson Braafheid – Bayern Munich, 1899 Hoffenheim – 2009–12
 Kees Bregman – MSV Duisburg, Arminia Bielefeld – 1974–79, 1980–82
 Joshua Brenet – 1899 Hoffenheim – 2018–19, 2020–22
 Brian Brobbey – RB Leipzig – 2021–22
 Roel Brouwers – Borussia M'gladbach – 2008–16
 Arnold Bruggink – Hannover 96 – 2006–10
 Jeffrey Bruma – Hamburger SV, VfL Wolfsburg, Schalke 04, Mainz 05  – 2011–13, 2016–20
 Delano Burgzorg – Mainz 05 – 2021–
 Dick van Burik – Hertha BSC – 1997–2007
 Ellery Cairo – SC Freiburg, Hertha BSC – 2003–05, 2005–07
 Luc Castaignos – Eintracht Frankfurt – 2015–16
 Romeo Castelen – Hamburger SV – 2007–08, 2009–10, 2011–12
 Tahith Chong – Werder Bremen – 2020–21
 Lorenzo Davids – FC Augsburg – 2011–12
 Jonathan de Guzmán – Eintracht Frankfurt – 2017–20
 Harry Decheiver – SC Freiburg, Borussia Dortmund – 1995–97, 1997–98
 Javairô Dilrosun – Hertha BSC – 2018–22
 Danilho Doekhi – Union Berlin – 2022–
 Bas Dost – VfL Wolfsburg, Eintracht Frankfurt – 2012–17, 2019–21
 Rick van Drongelen – Hamburger SV – 2017–18
 Rein van Duijnhoven – VfL Bochum – 2000–01, 2002–05
 René van Eck – 1. FC Nürnberg – 1998–99
 René Eijkelkamp – Schalke 04 – 1997–99
 Jurgen Ekkelenkamp – Hertha BSC – 2021–22
 Eljero Elia – Hamburger SV, Werder Bremen – 2009–15
 Orlando Engelaar – Schalke 04 – 2008–09
 Mark Flekken – SC Freiburg – 2018–
Timothy Fosu-Mensah – Bayer Leverkusen – 2020–
Jeremie Frimpong – Bayer Leverkusen – 2020–
 Dennis Gentenaar – Borussia Dortmund – 2005–06
 Ryan Gravenberch – Bayern Munich – 2022–
 Jeffrey Gouweleeuw – FC Augsburg – 2015–
 Cedric van der Gun – Borussia Dortmund – 2005–06
 Hans van de Haar – SSV Ulm – 1999–2000
 Heinz van Haaren – Meidericher SV, Schalke 04 – 1964–68, 1968–72
 John Heitinga – Hertha BSC – 2014–15
 Delano Hill – Hansa Rostock – 2001–05
 Marc van Hintum – Hannover 96 – 2002–03
 Kevin Hofland – VfL Wolfsburg – 2004–07
 Marco van Hoogdalem – Schalke 04 – 1996–2003
 Rick Hoogendorp – VfL Wolfsburg – 2005–07
 Justin Hoogma – 1899 Hoffenheim, Greuther Fürth – 2018–19, 2021–22
 Nico-Jan Hoogma – Hamburger SV – 1998–2004
 Mike van der Hoorn – Arminia Bielefeld – 2020–22
 Max Huiberts – Borussia M'gladbach – 1995–97
 Klaas-Jan Huntelaar – Schalke 04 – 2010–17, 2020–21
 Ola John – Hamburger SV – 2013–14
 Martin Jol – Bayern Munich – 1978–79
 Luuk de Jong – Borussia M'gladbach – 2012–14
 Nigel de Jong – Hamburger SV, Mainz 05 – 2005–09, 2017–18
 Jimmy Kaparos – Schalke 04 – 2020–21
 Davy Klaassen – Werder Bremen – 2018–20
 Justin Kluivert – RB Leipzig – 2020–21
 Johan de Kock – Schalke 04 – 1996–2000
 Samuel Koejoe – SC Freiburg – 2004–05
 Erwin Koen – Alemannia Aachen – 2006–07
 Michel van de Korput – 1. FC Köln – 1985–86
 Michael Lamey – MSV Duisburg, Arminia Bielefeld – 2007–08, 2008–09
 Sam Lammers – Eintracht Frankfurt – 2021–22
 Quido Lanzaat – Borussia M'gladbach – 2001–02
 Tommie van der Leegte – VfL Wolfsburg – 2005–07
 Jeffrey Leiwakabessy – Alemannia Aachen – 2006–07
 Arie van Lent – Werder Bremen, Borussia M'gladbach, Eintracht Frankfurt – 1991–93, 1995–98, 2001–04, 2005–06
 Matthijs de Ligt – Bayern Munich – 2022–
 Willi Lippens – Rot-Weiss Essen, Borussia Dortmund – 1966–67, 1969–71, 1973–79
 Jürgen Locadia – 1899 Hoffenheim, VfL Bochum – 2019–20, 2021–22
 Derrick Luckassen – Hertha BSC – 2018–19
 Jos Luhukay – KFC Uerdingen – 1995–96
 Anthony Lurling – 1. FC Köln – 2005–06
 Rob Maas – Arminia Bielefeld, Hertha BSC – 1996–98, 1998–99, 2000–03
 Roy Makaay – Bayern Munich – 2003–07
 Donyell Malen – Borussia Dortmund – 2021–
 Joris Mathijsen – Hamburger SV – 2006–11
 Marcel Meeuwis – Borussia M'gladbach – 2009–11
 Erik Meijer – KFC Uerdingen, Bayer Leverkusen, Hamburger SV – 1995–96, 1996–99, 2000–03
 Virgil Misidjan – 1. FC Nürnberg – 2018–19
 Egbert-Jan ter Mors – Rot-Weiss Essen – 1969–71
 Youri Mulder – Schalke 04 – 1993–2002
 Alfred Nijhuis – MSV Duisburg, Borussia Dortmund – 1991–92, 1993–95, 1996–97, 1998–2001
 Angelo Nijskens – Bayer Uerdingen – 1988–89
 Ruud van Nistelrooy – Hamburger SV – 2009–11
 Niels Oude Kamphuis – Schalke 04, Borussia M'gladbach – 1999–2006
 Thomas Ouwejan – Schalke 04 – 2022–
 Patrick Paauwe – Borussia M'gladbach – 2008–09
 Immanuel Pherai – Borussia Dortmund – 2021–22
 Gerrit Plomp – VfL Bochum – 1989–90
 Jacobus Prins – 1. FC Kaiserslautern – 1963–65
 Daishawn Redan – Hertha BSC – 2019–22
 Rob Reekers – VfL Bochum – 1986–93, 1994–95
 Karim Rekik – Hertha BSC – 2017–20
 Arjen Robben – Bayern Munich – 2009–19
 Lodewijk Roembiak – Werder Bremen – 1998–2000
 Bryan Roy – Hertha BSC – 1997–2001
 Mohamed Sankoh – VfB Stuttgart – 2020–22
 Bernard Schuiteman – Bayer Leverkusen – 1993–95
 Gerald Sibon – 1. FC Nürnberg – 2006–07
 Sonny Silooy – Arminia Bielefeld – 1996–98
 Daley Sinkgraven – Bayer Leverkusen – 2019–
 Jerry St. Juste – Mainz 05 – 2019–22
 Roberto Straal – Arminia Bielefeld – 1999–2000
 Wim Suurbier – Schalke 04 – 1977–78
 Guus Til – SC Freiburg – 2020–21
 Rafael van der Vaart – Hamburger SV – 2005–08, 2012–15
 Gerald Vanenburg – 1860 Munich – 1998–2000
 Micky van de Ven – VfL Wolfsburg – 2021–
 Paul Verhaegh – FC Augsburg, VfL Wolfsburg – 2011–19
 Frank Verlaat – VfB Stuttgart, Werder Bremen – 1995–99, 2000–03
 Vincent Vermeij – SC Freiburg – 2021–
 Heinz Versteeg – Meidericher SV – 1963–66
 Nick Viergever – Greuther Fürth – 2021–22
 Michel Vlap – Arminia Bielefeld – 2020–21
 Harry de Vlugt – Rot-Weiss Essen – 1973–75
 Anton Vriesde – VfL Bochum – 2002–04
 Stephanus Walbeek – Hertha BSC – 1975–76
 Thijs Waterink – Arminia Bielefeld – 1999–2000
 Wout Weghorst – VfL Wolfsburg – 2018–22
 Erik Willaarts – Borussia M'gladbach – 1987–89
 Jetro Willems – Eintracht Frankfurt, Greuther Fürth – 2017–19, 2021–22
 Jan Wouters – Bayern Munich – 1991–94
 Deyovaisio Zeefuik – Hertha BSC  – 2020–
 Joshua Zirkzee – Bayern Munich – 2019–21
 Kees Zwamborn – MSV Duisburg – 1981–82

North Macedonia
Until 1991 part of SFR Yugoslavia, from 1991 to 2019 named Republic of Macedonia
 Vančo Balevski – Karlsruher SC – 1976–77
 Darko Churlinov – 1. FC Köln, VfB Stuttgart – 2019–21, 2022–23
 Saša Ćirić – 1. FC Nürnberg, Eintracht Frankfurt – 1998–99, 2000–01, 2002–03
 Elvis Hajradinović – 1. FC Kaiserslautern – 1991–92
 Ferhan Hasani – VfL Wolfsburg – 2012–13
 Besart Ibraimi – Schalke 04 – 2009–10
 Goran Markov – Hansa Rostock – 1995–96
 Toni Micevski – Hansa Rostock, Energie Cottbus – 1995–98, 2000–01
 Igor Mitreski – Energie Cottbus – 2006–09
 Valmir Nafiu – Hamburger SV – 2014–15
 Oka Nikolov – Eintracht Frankfurt – 1995–96, 1998–2001, 2003–04, 2005–11, 2012–13
 Nikolče Noveski – Hansa Rostock, Mainz 05 – 1998–99, 2004–07, 2009–15
 Darko Pančev – VfB Leipzig, Fortuna Düsseldorf – 1993–94, 1995–96
 Metodije Spasovski – 1. FC Saarbrücken – 1976–77
 Mitko Stojkovski – VfB Stuttgart – 1997–99
 Borislav Tomovski – Hansa Rostock – 1997–98
 Vančo Trajanov – Arminia Bielefeld – 2004–05
 Aleksandar Vasoski – Eintracht Frankfurt – 2005–11

Norway
 Jan-Einar Aas – Bayern Munich – 1979–81
 Mohammed Abdellaoue – Hannover 96, VfB Stuttgart – 2010–14
 Per Egil Ahlsen – Fortuna Düsseldorf – 1990–91
 Jørn Andersen – 1. FC Nürnberg, Eintracht Frankfurt, Fortuna Düsseldorf, Hamburger SV, Dynamo Dresden – 1985–95
 André Bergdølmo – Borussia Dortmund – 2003–05
 Tommy Berntsen – Eintracht Frankfurt – 2000–01
 Morten Berre – FC St. Pauli – 2001–02
Fredrik André Bjørkan – Hertha BSC – 2021–
 Rune Bratseth – Werder Bremen – 1986–95
 Geirmund Brendesæter – Arminia Bielefeld – 1996–97
 Mats Møller Dæhli – SC Freiburg – 2014–15, 2016–17
 Vadim Demidov – Eintracht Frankfurt – 2012–13
 Hassan El Fakiri – Borussia M'gladbach – 2005–07
 Omar Elabdellaoui – Eintracht Braunschweig – 2013–14
 Tarik Elyounoussi – 1899 Hoffenheim – 2013–16
 Bård Finne – 1. FC Köln – 2014–15
 Jan Åge Fjørtoft – Eintracht Frankfurt – 1998–2001
 Havard Flo – Werder Bremen – 1996–99
 Iver Fossum – Hannover 96 – 2015–16, 2017–19
 Thomas Gill – MSV Duisburg – 1996–99
 Anders Giske – 1. FC Nürnberg, Bayer Leverkusen, 1. FC Köln – 1983–92
 Frode Grodås – Schalke 04 – 1998–99, 2000–01
Erling Haaland – Borussia Dortmund – 2019–22
 Jan Halvor Halvorsen – Hertha BSC – 1990–91
 Andreas Hanche-Olsen – Mainz 05 – 2022–
 Torjus Hansén – Arminia Bielefeld – 2002–03
 Jens Petter Hauge – Eintracht Frankfurt – 2021–22
 Henning Hauger – Hannover 96 – 2011–12
 Vegar Eggen Hedenstad – SC Freiburg – 2012–13
 Kai Erik Herlovsen – Borussia M'gladbach – 1982–89
 Jon Inge Høiland – 1. FC Kaiserslautern – 2005–06
 Jahn Ivar Jakobsen – MSV Duisburg – 1993–94
 Rune Jarstein – Hertha BSC – 2013–
 Erland Johnsen – Bayern Munich – 1988–90
 Joshua King – Borussia M'gladbach – 2011–12
 Tommy Larsen – 1. FC Nürnberg – 2001–03, 2004–05
 Trond Fredrik Ludvigsen – Hertha BSC – 2001–02
 Mikail Maden – Schalke 04 – 2020–21
 Erik Mykland – 1860 Munich – 2000–02
 Håvard Nielsen – Eintracht Braunschweig, SC Freiburg, Greuther Fürth – 2013–14, 2016–17, 2021–22
 Roger Nilsen – 1. FC Köln – 1992–93
 Håvard Nordtveit – 1. FC Nürnberg, Borussia M'gladbach, 1899 Hoffenheim – 2009–16, 2017–22
 Ørjan Nyland – FC Ingolstadt, RB Leipzig – 2015–17, 2022–
 Arne Larsen Økland – Bayer Leverkusen – 1980–83
 Terje Olsen – Bayer Leverkusen – 1988–89
 Morten Pedersen – Borussia M'gladbach – 1997–98
 Steinar Pedersen – Borussia Dortmund – 1996–98
 Tore Pedersen – FC St. Pauli, Eintracht Frankfurt – 1995–97, 1998–99
 Tore Reginiussen – Schalke 04 – 2009–10
 Kjetil Rekdal – Borussia M'gladbach, Hertha BSC – 1988–90, 1997–2000
 Birk Risa – 1. FC Köln – 2017–18
 Vidar Riseth – 1860 Munich – 2000–03
 Julian Ryerson – Union Berlin – 2019–
 Bent Skammelsrud – Bayer Leverkusen – 1997–98
 Per Ciljan Skjelbred – Hamburger SV, Hertha BSC – 2011–20
 Vegard Skogheim – Werder Bremen – 1988–89
 Erik Solér – Hamburger SV – 1984–86
 Jan-Derek Sørensen – Borussia Dortmund – 2000–02
 Alexander Sørloth – RB Leipzig – 2020–21, 2022–
 Gøran Sørloth – Borussia M'gladbach – 1988–89
 Morten Thorsby – Union Berlin – 2022–
 Erik Thorstvedt – Borussia M'gladbach – 1985–87

Poland
 Dariusz Adamczuk – Eintracht Frankfurt – 1992–93
 Wolfgang April (Bogdan Kwiecień) – Eintracht Frankfurt – 1985–86
 Henryk Bałuszyński – VfL Bochum – 1994–95, 1996–98, 2000–01
 Tomasz Bandrowski – Energie Cottbus – 2006–07
 Bartosz Białek – VfL Wolfsburg – 2020–
 Jarosław Biernat – Eintracht Frankfurt – 1986–87, 1988–89
 Jakub Błaszczykowski – Borussia Dortmund, VfL Wolfsburg – 2007–15, 2016–19
 Sebastian Boenisch – Schalke 04, Werder Bremen, Bayer Leverkusen – 2005–16
 Daniel Bogusz – Arminia Bielefeld – 2002–03, 2004–05
 Ariel Borysiuk – 1. FC Kaiserslautern – 2011–12
 Bartosz Bosacki – 1. FC Nürnberg – 2004–06
 Andrzej Buncol – FC Homburg, Bayer Leverkusen, Fortuna Düsseldorf – 1986–92, 1995–97
 Sławomir Chałaśkiewicz – Hansa Rostock – 1995–98
 Ryszard Cyroń – Hamburger SV, Fortuna Düsseldorf – 1991–92, 1995–97
 Jacek Dembinski – Hamburger SV – 1997–2000
 Wenanty Fuhl – 1. FC Saarbrücken – 1992–93
 Jan Furtok – Hamburger SV, Eintracht Frankfurt – 1988–95
 Rafał Gikiewicz – SC Freiburg, Union Berlin, FC Augsburg – 2017–18, 2019–
 Radosław Gilewicz – VfB Stuttgart, Karlsruher SC – 1995–98
 Janusz Góra – SSV Ulm – 1999–2000
 Jacek Góralski – VfL Bochum – 2022–
 Robert Gumny – FC Augsburg – 2020–
 Tomasz Hajto – MSV Duisburg, Schalke 04, 1. FC Nürnberg – 1997–2005
 Krzysztof Hetmański – FC Homburg – 1989–90
 Joachim Hutka – Fortuna Düsseldorf – 1981–82
 Andrzej Iwan – VfL Bochum – 1987–89
 Michał Janicki – VfL Wolfsburg – 2002–03
 Dennis Jastrzembski – Hertha BSC – 2018–20, 2021–22
 Andrzej Juskowiak – Borussia M'gladbach, VfL Wolfsburg, Energie Cottbus – 1996–2003
 Radosław Kałużny – Energie Cottbus, Bayer Leverkusen – 2001–05
 Jakub Kamiński – VfL Wolfsburg – 2022–
 Marcin Kamiński – VfB Stuttgart, Fortuna Düsseldorf, Schalke 04 – 2017–19, 2020–21 2022-
 Bartosz Kapustka – SC Freiburg – 2017–18
 Bartosz Karwan – Hertha BSC – 2002–04
 Tomasz Kłos – 1. FC Kaiserslautern, 1. FC Köln – 2000–04
 Andrzej Kobylański – 1. FC Köln, Energie Cottbus – 1992–94, 2000–03
 Martin Kobylański – Werder Bremen – 2013–14
 Tomasz Kos – 1. FC Nürnberg – 2001–03
 Kamil Kosowski – 1. FC Kaiserslautern – 2003–05
 Dawid Kownacki – Fortuna Düsseldorf – 2018–20
 Tadeusz Kraft – Borussia Dortmund – 1985–86
 Zbigniew Kruszyński – 1. FC Saarbrücken, FC Homburg – 1985–86, 1987–88
 Waldemar Kryger – VfL Wolfsburg – 1997–2002
 Paweł Kryszałowicz – Eintracht Frankfurt – 2000–01
 Jacek Krzynówek – 1. FC Nürnberg, Bayer Leverkusen, VfL Wolfsburg, Hannover 96 – 2001–03, 2004–10
 Mariusz Kukiełka – Energie Cottbus – 2006–09
 Adam Ledwoń – Bayer Leverkusen – 1997–99
 Andrzej Lesiak – Dynamo Dresden – 1994–95
 Marek Leśniak – Bayer Leverkusen, Wattenscheid 09, 1860 Munich, KFC Uerdingen – 1988–94, 1995–96

 Robert Lewandowski – Borussia Dortmund, Bayern Munich – 2010–22
 Jarosław Lindner – Hannover 96 – 2009–10
 Marcel Lotka – Hertha BSC – 2021–
 Sławomir Majak – Hansa Rostock – 1997–2001
 Stefan Majewski – 1. FC Kaiserslautern – 1984–87
 Adam Matuszczyk – 1. FC Köln – 2009–12, 2014–15
 Adam Matysek – Bayer Leverkusen – 1998–2001
 Waldemar Matysik – Hamburger SV – 1990–93
 Marcin Mięciel – Borussia M'gladbach, VfL Bochum – 2001–02, 2007–09
 Arkadiusz Milik – Bayer Leverkusen, FC Augsburg – 2012–14
 Maciej Murawski – Arminia Bielefeld – 2002–03
 Krzysztof Nowak – VfL Wolfsburg – 1998–2001
 Piotr Nowak – Dynamo Dresden, 1860 Munich – 1993–98
 Ludovic Obraniak – Werder Bremen – 2013–15
 Mirosław Okoński – Hamburger SV – 1986–88
 Paweł Olkowski – 1. FC Köln – 2014–18
 Andrzej Pałasz – Hannover 96 – 1987–89
 Sławomir Peszko – 1. FC Köln – 2010–12, 2014–15
 Krzysztof Piątek – Hertha BSC – 2019–
 Łukasz Piszczek – Hertha BSC, Borussia Dortmund – 2007–21
 Eugen Polanski – Borussia M'gladbach, Mainz 05, 1899 Hoffenheim – 2004–07, 2009–18
 Michał Probierz – Bayer Uerdingen – 1994–95
 Tymoteusz Puchacz – Union Berlin – 2022–
 Piotr Reiss – Hertha BSC, MSV Duisburg – 1998–2001
 Andrzej Rudy – 1. FC Köln – 1989–95
 Marek Saganowski – Hamburger SV – 1996–97
 Waldemar Słomiany – Schalke 04, Arminia Bielefeld – 1967–72
 Euzebiusz Smolarek – Borussia Dortmund – 2004–08
 Włodzimierz Smolarek – Eintracht Frankfurt – 1986–88
 Artur Sobiech – Hannover 96 – 2011–16
 Mirosław Spiżak – SpVgg Unterhaching – 2000–01
 Jarosław Studzizba – Eintracht Braunschweig – 1982–84
 Jakub Świerczok – 1. FC Kaiserslautern – 2011–12
 Dariusz Szubert – FC St. Pauli – 1995–96
 Cezary Tobollik – Eintracht Frankfurt – 1983–85
 Marek Trejgis – Hamburger SV – 1997–99
 Przemysław Trytko – Energie Cottbus – 2007–08
 Janusz Turowski – Eintracht Frankfurt – 1986–91

 Sebastian Tyrała – Borussia Dortmund, Greuther Fürth – 2006–08, 2012–13
 Piotr Tyszkiewicz – VfL Wolfsburg – 1997–98
 Przemysław Tytoń – VfB Stuttgart – 2015–16
 Helmut Vorreiter – Darmstadt 98 – 1981–82
 Tomasz Wałdoch – VfL Bochum, Schalke 04 – 1994–95, 1996–2006
 Witold Wawrzyczek – Energie Cottbus – 2000–02
 Artur Wichniarek – Arminia Bielefeld, Hertha BSC – 1999–2000, 2002–10
 Jakub Wierzchowski – Werder Bremen – 2002–03
 Grzegorz Więzik – 1. FC Kaiserslautern – 1989–90
 Tomasz Wisio – Arminia Bielefeld – 2004–05
 Roman Wójcicki – FC Homburg – 1986–88
 Sławomir Wojciechowski – Bayern Munich – 1999–2000
 Paweł Wojtala – Hamburger SV, Werder Bremen – 1996–2000
 Rudolf Wojtowicz – Bayer Leverkusen, Fortuna Düsseldorf – 1982–87, 1989–92
 Łukasz Załuska – Darmstadt 98 – 2015–16
 Tomasz Zdebel – 1. FC Köln, VfL Bochum, Bayer Leverkusen – 1993–97, 2003–05, 2006–10
 Dariusz Żuraw – Hannover 96 – 2002–08

Portugal
 Alex – VfL Wolfsburg – 2005–07
 Hugo Almeida – Werder Bremen, Hannover 96 – 2006–11, 2015–16
 Bruma – RB Leipzig – 2017–19
 Aurélio Buta – Eintracht Frankfurt – 2022–
 João Cancelo – Bayern Munich – 2022–
 Carlitos – Hannover 96 – 2010–12
 Marcel Correia – Eintracht Braunschweig – 2013–14
 Ricardo Costa – VfL Wolfsburg – 2007–10
 Tiago Dantas – Bayern Munich – 2020–21
 Gil Dias – VfB Stuttgart – 2022–
 José Dominguez – 1. FC Kaiserslautern – 2000–04
 Daniel Fernandes – VfL Bochum – 2008–10 
 Raphaël Guerreiro – Borussia Dortmund – 2016–
 Daniel Heuer Fernandes – Darmstadt 98 – 2016–17
 Diogo Leite – 1. FC Union Berlin – 2022–
 Maniche – 1. FC Köln – 2009–10
 Fernando Meira – VfB Stuttgart – 2001–08
 Gonçalo Paciência – Eintracht Frankfurt, Schalke 04 – 2018–22
 João Pereira – Hannover 96 – 2014–15
 Petit – 1. FC Köln – 2008–11
 Roberto Pinto – VfB Stuttgart, Hertha BSC, Arminia Bielefeld – 1998–2006
 Sérgio Pinto – Schalke 04, Alemannia Aachen, Hannover 96 – 1999–2000, 2002–04, 2006–13
 Eduardo Quaresma – 1899 Hoffenheim – 2022–
 Guilherme Ramos – Arminia Bielefeld – 2021–22
 Renato Sanches – Bayern Munich – 2016–17, 2018–19
 Henrique Sereno – 1. FC Köln – 2011–12
André Silva – Eintracht Frankfurt, RB Leipzig – 2019–
 Paulo Sousa – Borussia Dortmund – 1996–98
 Ricardo Sousa – Hannover 96 – 2004–06
 Tiago Tomás – VfB Stuttgart – 2021–
 Renato Veiga – FC Augsburg – 2022–
 Vieirinha – VfL Wolfsburg – 2011–17
 Abel Xavier – Hannover 96 – 2003–04
 Zé António – Borussia M'gladbach – 2005–07

Republic of Ireland
Noel Campbell – Fortuna Köln – 1973–74
Alan Clarke – Blau-Weiß 90 Berlin – 1986–87
Patrick Kohlmann – Borussia Dortmund – 2004–05
Conor Noß – Borussia M'gladbach – 2021–

Romania
 Ovidiu Burcă – Energie Cottbus – 2008–09
 Ciprian Deac – Schalke 04 – 2010–11
 Iulian Filipescu – MSV Duisburg – 2007–08
 Ionel Ganea – VfB Stuttgart – 1999–2003
 Vasile Gergely – Hertha BSC – 1970–72
 Sabin Ilie – Energie Cottbus – 2000–01
 Viorel Ion – VfL Bochum – 1998–99
 Ion Ionescu – Alemannia Aachen – 1968–70
 Alexandru Ioniță – 1. FC Köln – 2010–11
 Andreas Ivan – Schalke 04 – 2022–
 Emil Jula – Energie Cottbus – 2008–09
 Michael Klein – Bayer Uerdingen – 1990–91, 1992–93
 Ioan Lupescu – Bayer Leverkusen, Borussia M'gladbach – 1990–98
 Ciprian Marica – VfB Stuttgart, Schalke 04 – 2007–13
 Alexandru Maxim – VfB Stuttgart, Mainz 05 – 2012–16, 2017–20
 Dorinel Munteanu – 1. FC Köln, VfL Wolfsburg – 1995–98, 1999–2004
 Vlad Munteanu – Energie Cottbus, VfL Wolfsburg, Arminia Bielefeld – 2006–09
 Dumitru Nadu – Karlsruher SC – 1982–83, 1984–85
 Viorel Năstase – 1860 Munich – 1980–81
 Maximilian Nicu – Hertha BSC, SC Freiburg – 2008–12
 Marius Niculae – Mainz 05 – 2006–07
 Claudiu Niculescu – MSV Duisburg – 2007–08
 Gheorghe Popescu – Hannover 96 – 2002–03
 Cătălin Răcănel – FC St. Pauli – 2001–02
 Sergiu Radu – Energie Cottbus, VfL Wolfsburg, VfB Stuttgart, 1. FC Köln – 2006–09
 Claudiu Răducanu – Arminia Bielefeld – 2004–05
 Marcel Răducanu – Borussia Dortmund – 1982–88
 Florin Răducioiu – VfB Stuttgart – 1997–98
 Laurențiu Reghecampf – Energie Cottbus, Alemannia Aachen – 2000–03, 2006–07
 Alexandru Sătmăreanu – VfB Stuttgart – 1980–82
 Mihai Tararache – MSV Duisburg – 2005–06, 2007–08
 Daniel Timofte – Bayer Uerdingen – 1990–91
 Ion Vlădoiu – 1. FC Köln – 1996–98

Russia
Until 1991 Soviet Union, from 1991 to 1992 CIS
 Vladimir Beschastnykh – Werder Bremen – 1994–97
 Aleksandr Borodyuk – Schalke 04, SC Freiburg – 1991–96
 Dmitri Bulykin – Bayer Leverkusen – 2007–09
 Vladimir But – Borussia Dortmund, SC Freiburg, Hannover 96 – 1996–2002, 2003–05
 Stanislav Cherchesov – Dynamo Dresden – 1993–95
 Valeriy Chmarov – Karlsruher SC – 1991–94
 Igor Dobrovolski – Fortuna Düsseldorf – 1996–97
 Sergei Gorlukovich – Borussia Dortmund, Bayer Uerdingen – 1989–93, 1994–95
 Sergei Kiriakov – Karlsruher SC, Hamburger SV – 1992–99
 Denis Klyuyev – Schalke 04 – 1997–99
 Andrey Lunyov – Bayer Leverkusen – 2021–
 Sergei Mandreko – Hertha BSC, VfL Bochum – 1997–2001, 2002–03
 Roman Neustädter – Borussia M'gladbach, Schalke 04 – 2009–16 
 Nikolai Pisarev – FC St. Pauli – 1996–97
 Pavel Pogrebnyak – VfB Stuttgart – 2009–12
 Konstantin Rausch – Hannover 96, VfB Stuttgart, SV Darmstadt 98, 1. FC Köln – 2007–18
 Aleksandr Rytchkov – 1. FC Köln – 1997–98
 Ivan Saenko – 1. FC Nürnberg – 2005–08
 Yuri Savichev – 1. FC Saarbrücken, FC St. Pauli – 1992–93, 1995–97
 Igor Shalimov – MSV Duisburg – 1994–95
 Sergei Yuran – Fortuna Düsseldorf, VfL Bochum – 1996–98

Scotland
 Scott Booth – Borussia Dortmund – 1997–98
 Oliver Burke – RB Leipzig, Werder Bremen – 2016–17, 2022–
 Paul Lambert – Borussia Dortmund – 1996–98
 Murdo MacLeod – Borussia Dortmund – 1987–91
 Mark McGhee – Hamburger SV – 1984–86
 Alan McInally – Bayern Munich – 1989–92
 Vincent Mennie – 1. FC Köln – 1983–86
 Brian O'Neil – VfL Wolfsburg – 1998–2001

Serbia
Until 1992 SFR Yugoslavia, from 1992 to 2003 FR Yugoslavia, from 2003 to 2006 Serbia and Montenegro
 Aleksandar Abutović – 1. FC Nürnberg – 1988–89
 Jovan Aćimović – 1. FC Saarbrücken – 1976–78
 Srđan Baljak – Mainz 05 – 2009–10
 Milan Belić – 1. FC Nürnberg – 2002–03
 Stevan Bena – 1860 Munich, Hannover 96 – 1964–67
 Rade Bogdanović – Werder Bremen, Arminia Bielefeld – 1998–2001, 2002–03
 Srđan Čebinac – 1. FC Köln – 1965–66
 Zvezdan Čebinac – 1. FC Nürnberg, Hannover 96 – 1967–71
 Sava-Arangel Čestić – 1. FC Köln – 2020–21
 Željko Dakić – Bayer Uerdingen – 1992–93
 Boriša Đorđević – Hamburger SV – 1981–83
 Bratislav Đorđević – 1. FC Kaiserslautern – 1970–71
 Kristijan Đorđević – VfB Stuttgart, Schalke 04 – 1996–2002
 Slobodan Dubajić – VfB Stuttgart – 1991–95
 Nikola Đurđić – Greuther Fürth, FC Augsburg – 2012–13, 2014–15
 Demir Đurić – FC St. Pauli – 1996–97
 Filip Đuričić – Mainz 05 – 2014–15
 Vladimir Durković – Borussia M'gladbach – 1966–67
 Mijat Gaćinović – Eintracht Frankfurt, 1899 Hoffenheim – 2015–22
 Marko Grujić – Hertha BSC – 2018–20
 Aleksandar Ignjovski – Werder Bremen, Eintracht Frankfurt, SC Freiburg – 2011–17
 Dragomir Ilić – Werder Bremen – 1963–64
 Ivica Iliev – Energie Cottbus – 2008–09
 Vladimir Ivić – Borussia M'gladbach – 2004–05
 Srđan Janković – Wattenscheid 09 – 1990–92
 Branko Jelić – Energie Cottbus – 2007–09
 Miloš Jojić – Borussia Dortmund, 1. FC Köln – 2013–18
 Dejan Joveljić – Eintracht Frankfurt – 2019–20
 Luka Jović – Eintracht Frankfurt – 2017–19, 2020–21
 Živojin Juškić – 1. FC Nürnberg – 1998–99
 Gojko Kačar – Hertha BSC, Hamburger SV, FC Augsburg – 2007–13, 2014–18
 Slobodan Komljenović – Eintracht Frankfurt, MSV Duisburg, 1. FC Kaiserslautern – 1992–96, 1997–2001
 Filip Kostić – VfB Stuttgart, Hamburger SV, Eintracht Frankfurt – 2014–23
 Mladen Krstajić – Werder Bremen, Schalke 04 – 2000–09
 Nebojša Krupniković – Hannover 96, Arminia Bielefeld – 2002–06
 Filip Kusić – 1. FC Köln – 2017–18
 Zdravko Kuzmanović – VfB Stuttgart – 2009–13
 Miladin Lazić – Karlsruher SC – 1982–83
 Danko Lazović – Bayer Leverkusen – 2005–06
 Danijel Ljuboja – VfB Stuttgart, Hamburger SV, VfL Wolfsburg – 2005–09
 Miloš Marić – VfL Bochum – 2009–10
 Saša Marković – VfB Stuttgart – 1998–99
 Erhan Mašović – VfL Bochum – 2021–
 Slobodan Medojević – VfL Wolfsburg, Eintracht Frankfurt – 2012–16, 2017–18
 Jovan Miladinović – 1. FC Nürnberg – 1966–67
 Pedro Milasinčić – Hannover 96 – 1972–73
 Zoran Milinković – Hansa Rostock – 1998–99
 Vladan Milovanović – Dynamo Dresden – 1992–93
 Borisav Mitrović – Karlsruher SC – 1984–85
 Stefan Mitrović – SC Freiburg – 2014–15
 Filip Mladenović – 1. FC Köln – 2015–17
 Dragan Mutibarić – Schalke 04 – 1975–76
 Matija Nastasić – Schalke 04 – 2014–21
 Bojan Neziri – VfL Wolfsburg – 2005–06
 Žarko Nikolić – Schalke 04 – 1966–68
 Milan Obradović – Borussia M'gladbach – 2003–04
 Perica Ognjenović – 1. FC Kaiserslautern – 2001–02
 Marko Pantelić – Hertha BSC – 2005–09
 Vladimir Pašić – Fortuna Düsseldorf – 1996–97
 Miloš Pantović – Bayern Munich, VfL Bochum, Union Berlin – 2015–16, 2021–
 Veljko Paunović – Hannover 96 – 2004–05
 Đorđe Pavlić – MSV Duisburg – 1966–72
 Nemanja Pejčinović – Hertha BSC – 2009–10
 Dušan Petković – VfL Wolfsburg, 1. FC Nürnberg – 2001–03
 Nikola Petković – Eintracht Frankfurt – 2008–11
 Miodrag Petrović – 1. FC Köln, Werder Bremen – 1975–77
 Slobodan Petrović – 1. FC Nürnberg – 1978–79
 Milorad Pilipović – Karlsruher SC – 1987–90
 Darko Pivaljević – 1. FC Köln – 2000–02
 Milorad Popović – 1. FC Nürnberg – 2002–03
 Vladica Popović – VfB Stuttgart – 1965–66
 Petar Radenković – 1860 Munich – 1963–70
 Nemanja Radonjić – Hertha BSC – 2020–21
 Slobodan Rajković – Hamburger SV, Darmstadt 98 – 2011–16
 Sreto Ristić – VfB Stuttgart – 1996–2000
 Mileta Rnić – Arminia Bielefeld – 1978–79
 Antonio Rukavina – Borussia Dortmund – 2007–09
 Dragoslav Šekularac – Karlsruher SC – 1966–67
 Milutin Šoškić – 1. FC Köln – 1966–69, 1970–71
 Aleksandar Stevanović – Werder Bremen – 2011–13
 Dragan Stevanović – VfL Wolfsburg – 1997–98
 Predrag Stevanović – Werder Bremen – 2010–11
 Dragoslav Stepanović – Eintracht Frankfurt – 1976–78
 Miroslav Stević – Dynamo Dresden, 1860 Munich, Borussia Dortmund, VfL Bochum – 1992–2002, 2003–04
 Damir Stojak – Eintracht Frankfurt – 1998–99

 Neven Subotić – Mainz 05, Borussia Dortmund, 1. FC Köln, Union Berlin – 2006–07, 2008–18, 2019–20 
 Stanko Svitlica – Hannover 96 – 2003–04
 Rade Todorović – 1. FC Nürnberg – 2002–03
 Slobodan Topalović – 1. FC Köln – 1974–77
 Duško Tošić – Werder Bremen – 2007–10
 Zoran Tošić – 1. FC Köln – 2009–10
 Dragan Trkulja – SSV Ulm – 1999–2000
 Dušan Vasiljević – Energie Cottbus – 2007–09
 Miloš Veljković – Werder Bremen – 2015–21, 2022–
 Miroslav Vjetrović – Hannover 96 – 1985–86
 Nemanja Vučićević – 1. FC Köln – 2008–09
 Ivan Vukomanović – 1. FC Köln – 2000–01
 Ilija Zavišić – Eintracht Braunschweig – 1981–84
 Miodrag Živaljević – 1. FC Nürnberg – 1978–79

Slovakia
Until 1992 part of Czechoslovakia
 László Bénes – Borussia M'gladbach, FC Augsburg – 2016–22
 Balázs Borbély – 1. FC Kaiserslautern – 2005–06
 Igor Demo – Borussia M'gladbach – 2001–05
 Ondrej Duda – Hertha BSC, 1. FC Köln – 2016–
 Ján Ďurica – Hannover 96 – 2009–10
 Vratislav Greško – Bayer Leverkusen, 1. FC Nürnberg – 1999–2001, 2006–08
 Karim Guédé – SC Freiburg – 2011–15, 2016–18
 Ľuboš Hanzel – Schalke 04 – 2009–10
 Milan Ivana – Darmstadt 98 – 2015–16
 Erik Jendrišek – Hannover 96, Schalke 04, SC Freiburg – 2006–07, 2010–13
 Miroslav Karhan – VfL Wolfsburg, Mainz 05 – 2001–07, 2009–11
 Ján Kocian – FC St. Pauli – 1988–91
 Robert Kocis – Fortuna Düsseldorf – 1996–97
 Róbert Mak – 1. FC Nürnberg – 2010–14
 Pavel Mareček – MSV Duisburg – 1969–70
 Marek Mintál – 1. FC Nürnberg – 2004–08, 2009–11
 Ľubomír Moravčík – MSV Duisburg – 1998–99
 Adam Nemec – 1. FC Kaiserslautern – 2010–12
 Szilárd Németh – Alemannia Aachen – 2006–07
 Peter Pekarík – VfL Wolfsburg, Hertha BSC – 2008–11, 2013–
 Marek Penksa – Eintracht Frankfurt, Dynamo Dresden – 1992–95
 Stanislav Šesták – VfL Bochum – 2007–10
 Samuel Slovák – 1. FC Nürnberg – 2004–06
 Dušan Švento – 1. FC Köln – 2014–16
 Róbert Vittek – 1. FC Nürnberg – 2004–08
 Radoslav Zabavník – Mainz 05 – 2009–13
 Adam Zreľák – 1. FC Nürnberg – 2018–19

Slovenia
Until 1991 part of SFR Yugoslavia
 Roman Bezjak – Darmstadt 98 – 2016–17
 Mišo Brečko – Hamburger SV, 1. FC Köln – 2004–05, 2007–12, 2014–15
 Spasoje Bulajič – 1. FC Köln – 2000–02
 Zlatko Dedić – VfL Bochum – 2009–10
 Emir Dzafič – VfL Bochum – 1998–99
 Dragan Holcer – VfB Stuttgart – 1977–81
 Rudi Istenič – Fortuna Düsseldorf – 1995–97
 Kevin Kampl – Borussia Dortmund, Bayer Leverkusen, RB Leipzig – 2014–
 Adem Kapič – MSV Duisburg – 1997–98
 Srečko Katanec – VfB Stuttgart – 1988–89
 Aleksander Knavs – 1. FC Kaiserslautern, VfL Bochum – 2001–05
 Klemen Lavrič – MSV Duisburg – 2005–06, 2007–08
 Dominic Maroh – 1. FC Nürnberg, 1. FC Köln – 2009–12, 2014–18
 Tim Matavž – FC Augsburg – 2014–16
 Džoni Novak – SpVgg Unterhaching – 2000–01
 Milivoje Novaković – 1. FC Köln – 2008–12
 Branko Oblak – Schalke 04, Bayern Munich – 1975–80
 Miran Pavlin – SC Freiburg – 1998–2000
 Danilo Popivoda – Eintracht Braunschweig – 1975–80
 Branko Rodošek – Bayer Uerdingen – 1983–84, 1985–86
 Rajko Tavčar – 1. FC Nürnberg – 2001–02

Spain
 Paco Alcácer – Borussia Dortmund – 2018–20
 Xabi Alonso – Bayern Munich – 2014–17
 Angeliño – RB Leipzig, 1899 Hoffenheim – 2019–
 Marc Bartra – Borussia Dortmund – 2016–18
 Juan Bernat – Bayern Munich – 2014–18
 Bojan – Mainz 05 – 2016–17
 Iker Bravo – Bayer Leverkusen – 2021–
 Ignacio Camacho – VfL Wolfsburg – 2017–19
 José Campaña – 1. FC Nürnberg – 2013–14
 Dani Carvajal – Bayer Leverkusen – 2012–13
 Thomas Christiansen – VfL Bochum, Hannover 96 – 2000–01, 2002–06
 Coke – Schalke 04 – 2016–18
 Álvaro Domínguez – Borussia M'gladbach – 2012–16
 Sergio Escudero – Schalke 04 – 2010–12
 Ezequiel – SC Freiburg – 2012–13
 Fernando – Hannover 96 – 2002–03
 Álex Gálvez – Werder Bremen – 2014–16
 Alfonso Garcia – SpVgg Unterhaching – 1999–2001
 Sergio Gómez Martín – Borussia Dortmund – 2017–18
 Pablo Insua – Schalke 04 – 2017–18
 Jaime – Hannover 96 – 2002–04
 Jairo – Mainz 05 – 2014–18
 José Manuel – Hannover 96 – 2002–03
 Joselu – 1899 Hoffenheim, Eintracht Frankfurt, Hannover 96 – 2012–15
 Juanan – Fortuna Düsseldorf – 2012–13
 José Manuel Jurado – Schalke 04 – 2010–12
 Diego León – Arminia Bielefeld – 2004–06
 Pablo Maffeo – VfB Stuttgart – 2018–19
 Aarón Martín – Mainz 05 – 2018–
 Javi Martínez – Bayern Munich – 2012–21
 Josep Martínez – RB Leipzig – 2020–22
 Omar Mascarell – Eintracht Frankfurt, Schalke 04 – 2016–21
 Borja Mayoral – VfL Wolfsburg – 2016–17
 Jorge Meré – 1. FC Köln – 2017–18, 2019–22
 Mikel Merino – Borussia Dortmund – 2016–17
 Juan Miranda – Schalke 04 – 2019–20
 David Montero – Eintracht Frankfurt – 2003–04
Mateu Morey – Borussia Dortmund – 2019–21
 Hugo Novoa – RB Leipzig – 2021–
 Álvaro Odriozola – Bayern Munich – 2019–20
 Dani Olmo – RB Leipzig – 2019–
 Rafa – SC Paderborn – 2014–15
 Raúl – Schalke 04 – 2010–12
 Pepe Reina – Bayern Munich – 2014–15
 Marc Roca – Bayern Munich – 2020–22
 José Rodríguez – Mainz 05 – 2016–17
 Oriol Romeu – VfB Stuttgart – 2014–15
 Rubén – Borussia M'gladbach – 2003–04
 Thiago – Bayern Munich – 2013–20
 Marc Torrejón – SC Freiburg – 2014–15, 2016–17
 Lucas Torró – Eintracht Frankfurt – 2018–20
 Jesús Vallejo – Eintracht Frankfurt – 2016–17

Sweden
 Marcus Allbäck – Hansa Rostock – 2004–05
 Björn Andersson – Bayern Munich – 1974–77
 Christoffer Andersson – Hannover 96 – 2006–07
 Patrik Andersson – Borussia M'gladbach, Bayern Munich – 1993–2001
 Sebastian Andersson – Union Berlin, 1. FC Köln – 2019–
 Thomas Andersson – VfL Bochum – 1982–83
 Magnus Arvidsson – Hansa Rostock – 1999–2005
 Sanny Åslund – Werder Bremen – 1975–76
 Ludwig Augustinsson – Werder Bremen – 2017–21
 Denni Avdić – Werder Bremen – 2010–11
 Nabil Bahoui – Hamburger SV – 2015–17
 Pierre Bengtsson – Mainz 05 – 2014–16
 Rasmus Bengtsson – Hertha BSC – 2009–10
 Marcus Berg – Hamburger SV – 2009–10, 2011–13
 Hasse Borg – Eintracht Braunschweig – 1977–80, 1981–83
 Matias Concha – VfL Bochum – 2007–10
 Dan Corneliusson – VfB Stuttgart – 1983–84
 Martin Dahlin – Borussia M'gladbach, Hamburger SV – 1991–97, 1998–99
 Albin Ekdal – Hamburger SV – 2015–18
 Johnny Ekström – Bayern Munich, Dynamo Dresden, Eintracht Frankfurt – 1988–89, 1994–96
 Jan Eriksson – 1. FC Kaiserslautern – 1992–94
 Alexander Farnerud – VfB Stuttgart – 2006–08
 Emil Forsberg – RB Leipzig – 2016–
 Christer Fursth – 1. FC Köln – 1996–97
 Tobias Grahn – Hertha BSC – 2007–08
 Lars Granström – Karlsruher SC – 1966–67
 Jiloan Hamad – 1899 Hoffenheim – 2013–16
 Ronnie Hellström – 1. FC Kaiserslautern – 1974–84
 Hans Holmqvist – Fortuna Düsseldorf – 1984–86
 Branimir Hrgota – Borussia M'gladbach, Eintracht Frankfurt, Greuther Fürth – 2012–19, 2021–22
 Alexander Isak – Borussia Dortmund – 2017–18
 Mikael Ishak – 1. FC Köln, 1. FC Nürnberg – 2011–12, 2018–19
 Andreas Jakobsson – Hansa Rostock – 2000–03
 Andreas Johansson – VfL Bochum – 2009–10
 Nils-Eric Johansson – Bayern Munich, 1. FC Nürnberg – 1998–99, 2001–02
 Rasmus Jönsson – VfL Wolfsburg – 2011–13
 Isaac Kiese Thelin – Bayer Leverkusen – 2018–19
 Niclas Kindvall – Hamburger SV – 1994–96
 Marcus Lantz – Hansa Rostock – 1999–2005
 Bo Larsson – VfB Stuttgart – 1966–69
 Jordan Larsson – Schalke 04 – 2022–
 Lennart Larsson – Schalke 04 – 1977–79
 Mats Lilienberg – 1860 Munich – 1994–95
 Andreas Linde – Greuther Fürth – 2021–22
 Roger Ljung – MSV Duisburg – 1994–95
 Teddy Lučić – Bayer Leverkusen – 2003–04
 Benno Magnusson – 1. FC Kaiserslautern, Hertha BSC – 1973–76
 Roger Magnusson – 1. FC Köln – 1966–67
 Jan Mattsson – Fortuna Düsseldorf, Bayer Uerdingen – 1975–77, 1979–81
 Alexander Milošević – Hannover 96, Darmstadt 98 – 2015–17
 Joakim Nilsson – Arminia Bielefeld – 2020–22
 Per Nilsson – 1899 Hoffenheim, 1. FC Nürnberg – 2008–14
 Torbjörn Nilsson – 1. FC Kaiserslautern – 1982–84
 Billy Ohlsson – Arminia Bielefeld – 1978–79
 Jan Olsson – VfB Stuttgart – 1969–71
 Joakim Persson – Hansa Rostock – 2002–05
 Jörgen Pettersson – Borussia M'gladbach, 1. FC Kaiserslautern – 1995–2002
 Rade Prica – Hansa Rostock – 2002–05
 Robert Prytz – Bayer Uerdingen – 1987–88
 Robin Quaison – Mainz 05 – 2016–21
 Jonny Rödlund – Energie Cottbus – 2000–01
 Markus Rosenberg – Werder Bremen – 2006–10, 2011–12
 Roland Sandberg – 1. FC Kaiserslautern – 1973–77
 Thomas Sjöberg – Karlsruher SC – 1976–77
 Niklas Skoog – MSV Duisburg, 1. FC Nürnberg – 1996–99
 Fredrik Stenman – Bayer Leverkusen – 2005–07
 Mattias Svanberg – VfL Wolfsburg – 2022–
 Jan Svensson – Eintracht Frankfurt – 1983–86
 Conny Torstensson – Bayern Munich – 1973–77
 Sharbel Touma – Borussia M'gladbach – 2008–09
 Benny Wendt – 1. FC Köln, Tennis Borussia Berlin, 1. FC Kaiserslautern – 1975–81
 Oscar Wendt – Borussia M'gladbach – 2011–21
 Peter Wibrån – Hansa Rostock – 1998–2003

Switzerland
 Orhan Ademi – Eintracht Braunschweig – 2013–14
 François Affolter – Werder Bremen – 2011–12
 Albian Ajeti – FC Augsburg – 2015–16
 Manuel Akanji – Borussia Dortmund – 2017–22
 Anton Allemann – 1. FC Nürnberg – 1964–66
 Martin Angha – 1. FC Nürnberg – 2013–14
 Tranquillo Barnetta – Hannover 96, Bayer Leverkusen, Schalke 04, Eintracht Frankfurt – 2004–15
 Valon Behrami – Hamburger SV – 2014–15
 Diego Benaglio – VfL Wolfsburg – 2007–17
 Steve von Bergen – Hertha BSC – 2007–10
 Bruno Berner – SC Freiburg – 2003–05
 René Botteron – 1. FC Köln, 1. FC Nürnberg – 1980–83
 Cédric Brunner – Arminia Bielefeld, Schalke 04 – 2020–
 Nishan Burkart – SC Freiburg – 2020–
 Roman Bürki – SC Freiburg, Borussia Dortmund – 2014–22
 Ricardo Cabanas – 1. FC Köln – 2005–06
 Mario Cantaluppi – 1. FC Nürnberg – 2004–06
 Stéphane Chapuisat – Bayer Uerdingen, Borussia Dortmund – 1990–99
 Fabio Coltorti – RB Leipzig – 2016–17
 Saulo Decarli – VfL Bochum – 2021–22
 David Degen – Borussia M'gladbach – 2006–07
 Philipp Degen – Borussia Dortmund, VfB Stuttgart – 2005–08, 2010–11
 Eren Derdiyok – Bayer Leverkusen, 1899 Hoffenheim – 2009–14
 Johan Djourou – Hannover 96, Hamburger SV – 2012–17
 Josip Drmić – 1. FC Nürnberg, Bayer Leverkusen, Borussia M'gladbach, Hamburger SV – 2013–18
 Mario Eggimann – Karlsruher SC, Hannover 96 – 2007–13
 André Egli – Borussia Dortmund – 1984–85
 Rudolf Elsener – Eintracht Frankfurt – 1978–79
 Nico Elvedi – Borussia M'gladbach – 2015–
 Breel Embolo – Schalke 04, Borussia M'gladbach – 2016–22
 Beg Ferati – SC Freiburg – 2011–12
 Edimilson Fernandes – Mainz 05, Arminia Bielefeld – 2019–
 Gélson Fernandes – SC Freiburg, Eintracht Frankfurt – 2013–14, 2017–20
 Sébastien Fournier – VfB Stuttgart – 1996–97
 Alexander Frei – Borussia Dortmund – 2006–09
 Fabian Frei – Mainz 05 – 2015–18
 Michael Frey – Schalke 04 – 2022–
 Ulisses Garcia – Werder Bremen – 2015–18
 Mario Gavranović – Schalke 04, Mainz 05 – 2009–12
 Anto Grgić – VfB Stuttgart – 2017–18
 Christian Gross – VfL Bochum – 1980–82
 Daniel Gygax – 1. FC Nürnberg – 2009–10
 Florent Hadergjonaj – FC Ingolstadt – 2016–17
 Stéphane Henchoz – Hamburger SV – 1995–97
 Andreas Hilfiker – 1. FC Nürnberg – 1998–99
 Andreas Hirzel – Hamburger SV – 2015–16
 Marwin Hitz – VfL Wolfsburg, FC Augsburg, Borussia Dortmund – 2009–12, 2013–22
 Benjamin Huggel – Eintracht Frankfurt – 2005–07
 Cedric Itten – Greuther Fürth – 2021–22
 Vasilije Janjičić – Hamburger SV – 2016–18
 Nassim Ben Khalifa – 1. FC Nürnberg – 2010–11
 Timm Klose – 1. FC Nürnberg, VfL Wolfsburg – 2011–16
 Adrian Knup – VfB Stuttgart, Karlsruher SC – 1992–96
 Gregor Kobel – 1899 Hoffenheim, FC Augsburg, VfB Stuttgart, Borussia Dortmund – 2018–19, 2020–
 Oumar Kondé – SC Freiburg – 1999–2002, 2003–05
 Adrian Kunz – Werder Bremen – 1997–99
 Michael Lang – Borussia M'gladbach, Werder Bremen – 2018–20
 Stephan Lichtsteiner – FC Augsburg – 2019–20
 Fabian Lustenberger – Hertha BSC – 2007–10, 2011–12, 2013–19
 Ludovic Magnin – Werder Bremen, VfB Stuttgart – 2001–10
 Kevin Mbabu – VfL Wolfsburg – 2019–22
Admir Mehmedi – SC Freiburg, Bayer Leverkusen, VfL Wolfsburg – 2013–22
 Rémo Meyer – 1860 Munich – 2002–04
 Kurt Müller – Hertha BSC – 1972–75
 Yvon Mvogo – RB Leipzig – 2017–20
 Markus Neumayr – MSV Duisburg 2007–08
 Adrian Nikçi – Hannover 96 – 2012–13
 Blaise Nkufo – Hannover 96 – 2002–03
 Jonas Omlin – Borussia M'gladbach – 2022–
 David Pallas – VfL Bochum – 2006–07
 Francisco Rodríguez – VfL Wolfsburg – 2015–16
 Ricardo Rodríguez – VfL Wolfsburg – 2011–17

 Fabian Schär – 1899 Hoffenheim – 2015–17
 Pirmin Schwegler – Bayer Leverkusen, Eintracht Frankfurt, 1899 Hoffenheim, Hannover 96 – 2006–11, 2012–19
 Haris Seferovic – Eintracht Frankfurt – 2014–17
 Daniel Sereinig – SC Freiburg – 2010–11
 Vincent Sierro – SC Freiburg – 2017–18
 Ciriaco Sforza – 1. FC Kaiserslautern, Bayern Munich – 1993–96, 1997–2003, 2004–06
 Xherdan Shaqiri – Bayern Munich – 2012–15
 Yann Sommer – Borussia M'gladbach, Bayern Munich – 2014–
 Djibril Sow – Borussia M'gladbach, Eintracht Frankfurt – 2016–17, 2019–
 Christoph Spycher – Eintracht Frankfurt – 2005–10
 Renato Steffen – VfL Wolfsburg – 2017–
 Jörg Stiel – Borussia M'gladbach – 2001–04
 Valentin Stocker – Hertha BSC – 2014–18
 Marco Streller – VfB Stuttgart, 1. FC Köln – 2003–07
 Alain Sutter – 1. FC Nürnberg, Bayern Munich, SC Freiburg – 1993–97
 Shani Tarashaj – Eintracht Frankfurt – 2016–17
 Ruben Vargas – FC Augsburg – 2019–
 Marco Walker – 1860 Munich – 1996–98
 Raphaël Wicky – Werder Bremen, Hamburger SV – 1997–2007
 Silvan Widmer – Mainz 05 – 2021–
 Rolf Wüthrich – 1. FC Nürnberg – 1964–65
 Granit Xhaka – Borussia M'gladbach – 2012–16
 Hakan Yakin – VfB Stuttgart – 2003–05
 Murat Yakin – VfB Stuttgart, 1. FC Kaiserslautern – 1997–98, 2000–01
 Denis Zakaria – Borussia M'gladbach – 2017–22
 Marc Zellweger – 1. FC Köln – 2001–02
 Andi Zeqiri – FC Augsburg – 2021–22
 Reto Ziegler – Hamburger SV – 2005–06
 Steven Zuber – 1899 Hoffenheim, VfB Stuttgart, Eintracht Frankfurt – 2014–21
 Pascal Zuberbühler – Bayer Leverkusen – 2000–01

Turkey

Mehmet Akgün – Borussia Dortmund – 2004–05, 2007–08
Fatih Akyel – VfL Bochum – 2004–05
Erhan Albayrak – Werder Bremen, Arminia Bielefeld – 1995–96, 2002–03
Batuhan Altıntaş – Hamburger SV – 2015–16
Halil Altıntop – 1. FC Kaiserslautern, Schalke 04, Eintracht Frankfurt, FC Augsburg – 2003–11, 2013–17
Hamit Altıntop – Schalke 04, Bayern Munich, Darmstadt 98 – 2003–11, 2016–17
Özcan Arkoç – Hamburger SV – 1967–74
Çağdaş Atan – Energie Cottbus – 2008–09
Okan Aydın – Bayer Leverkusen – 2012–13
Kaan Ayhan – Schalke 04, Eintracht Frankfurt, Fortuna Düsseldorf – 2013–16, 2018–20
Onur Ayık – Werder Bremen – 2009–11
Deniz Barış – FC St. Pauli – 2001–02
Yıldıray Baştürk – VfL Bochum, Bayer Leverkusen, Hertha BSC, VfB Stuttgart – 1997–99, 2000–10
Ömer Beyaz – VfB Stuttgart – 2021–22
Ferhat Bıkmaz – Hannover 96 – 2007–08
Erol Bulut – Eintracht Frankfurt – 1999–2001
Onur Bulut – SC Freiburg – 2016–18
Hakan Çalhanoğlu – Hamburger SV, Bayer Leverkusen – 2013–17
Mahmut Çalışkan – 1. FC Köln – 1992–93
Nizamettin Çalışkan – Borussia Dortmund – 2005–06
Tolcay Ciğerci – Hamburger SV – 2014–15
Tolga Ciğerci – VfL Wolfsburg, Borussia M'gladbach, Hertha BSC – 2010–16
Ümit Davala – Werder Bremen – 2003–06
Ersan Doğu – Werder Bremen – 1995–96
Mehmet Ekici – 1. FC Nürnberg, Werder Bremen – 2010–14
Mevlüt Erdinç – Hannover 96 – 2015–16
Berkant Göktan – Borussia M'gladbach, Bayern Munich, Arminia Bielefeld, 1. FC Kaiserslautern – 1998–2001, 2005–06
Ceyhun Gülselam – Hannover 96 – 2014–16
Neşat Gülünoğlu – VfL Bochum – 1996–99
Özkan Gümüş – Hamburger SV – 1997–98
Ali Güneş – SC Freiburg – 1998–2000
Sercan Güvenışık – MSV Duisburg – 1999–2000
Burak Ince – Arminia Bielefeld – 2021–22
Uğur İnceman – FC St. Pauli – 2001–02
Ozan Kabak – VfB Stuttgart, Schalke 04, TSG Hoffenheim – 2018–21, 2022–
Deniz Kadah – Hannover 96 – 2012–14
Sinan Kaloğlu – VfL Bochum – 2008–09
Burak Kaplan – Bayer Leverkusen – 2009–10
Kenan Karaman – 1899 Hoffenheim, Hannover 96, Fortuna Düsseldorf, Schalke 04 – 2013–16, 2017–20, 2022–
Burhanettin Kaymak – Eintracht Frankfurt – 1995–96, 1998–99
Erdal Keser – Borussia Dortmund – 1980–84, 1986–87

Ender Konca – Eintracht Frankfurt – 1971–73
Oktay Kuday – Karlsruher SC – 1997–98
Ahmed Kutucu – Schalke 04 – 2018–21
Yunus Mallı – Mainz 05, VfL Wolfsburg, Union Berlin – 2011–21
Hami Mandıralı – Schalke 04 – 1998–99
Ersen Martin – 1. FC Nürnberg – 1998–99
Emre Mor – Borussia Dortmund – 2016–17
Erhan Önal – Bayern Munich – 1976–78 
Alpay Özalan – 1. FC Köln – 2005–06
Ümit Özat – 1. FC Köln – 2008–09
Berkay Özcan – VfB Stuttgart – 2017–19
Salih Özcan – 1. FC Köln, Borussia Dortmund – 2016–18, 2020–
Aykut Özer – Eintracht Frankfurt – 2012–13
Abdulkadir Özgen – Alemannia Aachen – 2006–07
Sezer Öztürk – Bayer Leverkusen, 1. FC Nürnberg – 2004–06
Mahir Sağlık – VfL Wolfsburg, Karlsruher SC, SC Paderborn – 2008–09, 2014–15
Olcay Şahan – 1. FC Kaiserslautern – 2011–12
Kenan Şahin – Bayer Leverkusen – 2003–05

Nuri Şahin – Borussia Dortmund, Werder Bremen – 2005–07, 2008–11, 2012–20
Tuncay – VfL Wolfsburg – 2010–11
Sercan Sararer – Greuther Fürth, VfB Stuttgart – 2012–15
Çağlar Söyüncü – SC Freiburg – 2016–18
Aytaç Sulu – Darmstadt – 2015–17
Sinan Tekerci – 1. FC Nürnberg – 2013–14
Ömer Toprak – SC Freiburg, Bayer Leverkusen, Borussia Dortmund, Werder Bremen – 2009–21
Gökhan Töre – Hamburger SV – 2011–12
Tunay Torun – Hamburger SV, Hertha BSC, VfB Stuttgart – 2008–13
Cenk Tosun – Eintracht Frankfurt – 2009–10
İlyas Tüfekçi – VfB Stuttgart, Schalke 04 – 1980–83
Volkan Ünlü – Schalke 04 – 2003–04
Aykut Ünyazıcı – Eintracht Braunschweig – 1963–65
Ahmet Usman – FC St. Pauli – 1996–97
Soner Uysal – Hamburger SV – 1997–98, 1999–2000
Engin Verel – Hertha BSC – 1979–80
Hasan Vural – Hertha BSC – 1997–98
Timur Yanyalı – 1860 Munich – 1994–95
Zafer Yelen – Hansa Rostock – 2007–08
Deniz Yılmaz – Mainz 05 – 2011–12
Selçuk Yula – Blau-Weiß 90 Berlin – 1986–87

Ukraine
Until 1991 part of Soviet Union, from 1991 to 1992 part of CIS
 Ihor Belanov – Borussia M'gladbach – 1989–91
 Oleksiy Byelik – VfL Bochum – 2007–08
 Serhiy Dikhtiar – Schalke 04 – 1993–96
 Artem Fedetskyi – Darmstadt 98 – 2016–17
 Yevhen Konoplyanka – Schalke 04 – 2016–19
 Dmytro Kovalenko – FC St. Pauli – 2001–02
 Artem Kravets – VfB Stuttgart – 2015–16
 Volodymyr Lyutyi – MSV Duisburg, VfL Bochum – 1991–93
 Yuriy Maksymov – Werder Bremen – 1997–2001
 Denys Oliynyk – Darmstadt 98 – 2016–17
 Ivan Ordets - VfL Bochum - 2022-
 Andriy Polunin – 1. FC Nürnberg – 1998–99
 Yevhen Shakhov – 1. FC Kaiserslautern – 1989–90
 Viktor Skrypnyk – Werder Bremen – 1996–2004
 Andriy Sydelnykov – Wattenscheid 09 – 1991–92
 Borys Tashchy – VfB Stuttgart – 2015–16
 Anatoliy Tymoshchuk – Bayern Munich – 2009–13
 Andriy Voronin – Borussia M'gladbach, 1. FC Köln, Bayer Leverkusen, Hertha BSC, Fortuna Düsseldorf – 1997–98, 2003–07, 2008–09, 2012–13
 Vladlen Yurchenko – Bayer Leverkusen – 2014–17
 Andriy Yarmolenko – Borussia Dortmund – 2017–18

Wales
 Ethan Ampadu – RB Leipzig – 2019–20
 Mark Hughes – Bayern Munich – 1987–88
 Rabbi Matondo – Schalke 04 – 2018–21
 Dean Thomas – Fortuna Düsseldorf – 1985–87
 Wayne Thomas – Bayer Uerdingen, Hannover 96 – 1983–86, 1987–88

CONMEBOL

Argentina
 David Abraham – 1899 Hoffenheim, Eintracht Frankfurt – 2012–21
 Oscar Ahumada – VfL Wolfsburg – 2004–05
 Lucas Alario – Bayer Leverkusen – 2017–
 Santiago Ascacíbar – VfB Stuttgart, Hertha BSC – 2017–22
 Fernando Ávalos – MSV Duisburg – 2007–08
 Leonardo Balerdi – Borussia Dortmund – 2019–20
 José Basualdo – VfB Stuttgart – 1989–91
 Sergio Bustos – 1. FC Nürnberg – 1992–94
 Rodrigo Cardoso – FC Homburg, SC Freiburg, Werder Bremen, Hamburger SV – 1989–90, 1993–98, 1999–2004
 Marcelo Carracedo – Fortuna Düsseldorf – 1989–92
 Matías Cenci – FC St. Pauli – 2001–02
 Emanuel Centurión – VfB Stuttgart – 2003–05
 Leandro Cufré – Hertha BSC – 2008–09
 Andrés D'Alessandro – VfL Wolfsburg – 2003–06
 Pablo de Blasis – Mainz 05 – 2014–19
 Martín Demichelis – Bayern Munich – 2003–11
 Franco Di Santo – Werder Bremen, Schalke 04 – 2013–19
 Christian Dollberg – 1. FC Köln – 1995–96
 Juan Fernández – Borussia Dortmund – 2002–04
 Santiago García – Werder Bremen – 2013–17
 Christian Giménez – Hertha BSC – 2006–07
 Nicolás González – VfB Stuttgart – 2018–19, 2020–21
 Emiliano Insúa – VfB Stuttgart – 2015–16, 2017–19
 Federico Insúa – Borussia M'gladbach – 2006–07
 Diego Klimowicz – VfL Wolfsburg, Borussia Dortmund, VfL Bochum – 2001–10
 Cristian Raúl Ledesma – Hamburger SV – 2002–03
 Sergio Silvano Maciel – FC Homburg – 1989–90
 Patricio Margetic – Borussia Dortmund – 1988–89
 Aníbal Matellán – Schalke 04 – 2001–04
 Juan Carlos Menseguez – VfL Wolfsburg – 2003–07
 Ricardo-Horacio Neumann – 1. FC Köln – 1972–74
 Exequiel Palacios – Bayer Leverkusen – 2019–
 Javier Pinola – 1. FC Nürnberg – 2005–08, 2009–14
 Diego Placente – Bayer Leverkusen – 2000–05
 Pablo Quatrocchi – VfL Wolfsburg – 2002–04
 Facundo Hernán Quiroga – VfL Wolfsburg – 2004–08
 Leonardo Rodríguez – Borussia Dortmund – 1993–94
 Bernardo Romeo – Hamburger SV – 2001–05
 Christian Rudzki – Hannover 96 – 1972–73
 Juan Pablo Sorín – Hamburger SV – 2006–08
 José Sosa – Bayern Munich – 2007–10
 Sergio Zárate – 1. FC Nürnberg, Hamburger SV – 1990–92, 1993–95
 Franco Zuculini – 1899 Hoffenheim – 2009–10

Bolivia
 Marcelo Moreno – Werder Bremen – 2009–10

Brazil

 Abuda – VfL Wolfsburg – 2005–06
 Adhemar – VfB Stuttgart – 2000–02
 Adi – Energie Cottbus – 2008–09
 Aílton – Werder Bremen, Schalke 04, Hamburger SV, MSV Duisburg – 1998–2006, 2007–08
 Ailton – VfB Stuttgart – 2017–18
 Alcides – Schalke 04 – 2003–04
 Carlos Alberto – Werder Bremen – 2007–08
 Allan – Hertha BSC, Eintracht Frankfurt – 2016–17, 2018–19
 Alex Alves – Hertha BSC – 1999–2003
 Rodrigo Alvim – VfL Wolfsburg – 2008–09
 Márcio Amoroso – Borussia Dortmund – 2001–04
 Anderson – Borussia M'gladbach, Eintracht Frankfurt – 2010–11, 2012–15
 Andrezinho – 1. FC Köln – 2010–12
 Marcos António – 1. FC Nürnberg – 2012–13
 Arílson – 1. FC Kaiserslautern – 1995–96
 Athirson – Bayer Leverkusen – 2005–07
 Renato Augusto – Bayer Leverkusen – 2008–13
 Danilo Avelar – Schalke 04 – 2010–11
 Fernando Baiano – VfL Wolfsburg – 2003–04
 Júnior Baiano – Werder Bremen – 1995–96
 Michel Bastos – Schalke 04 – 2012–13
 Bernardo (Bernardo Fernandes da Silva) – Bayern Munich – 1991–92 
 Bernardo (Bernardo Fernandes da Silva Junior) – RB Leipzig – 2016–18
 Marcelo Bordon – VfB Stuttgart, Schalke 04 – 1999–2010
 Márcio Borges – Arminia Bielefeld – 1999–2000, 2002–03, 2004–07
 Brasília – Energie Cottbus – 2001–02
 Breno – Bayern Munich, 1. FC Nürnberg – 2007–11
 Waldomir Pacheco Buca – Hamburger SV – 1979–80
 Júnior Caiçara – Schalke 04 – 2015–17
 Caio – Eintracht Frankfurt – 2007–11
 Caiuby – VfL Wolfsburg, FC Augsburg – 2008–09, 2014–19
 Cauly – SC Paderborn – 2019–20
 César – Hertha BSC – 2009–10
 Júlio César – Borussia Dortmund, Werder Bremen – 1994–2000
 Chiquinho – Borussia M'gladbach – 1997–99
 Chris – Eintracht Frankfurt, VfL Wolfsburg – 2003–04, 2005–12
 Cícero – Hertha BSC, VfL Wolfsburg – 2008–11
 Cléber – Hamburger SV – 2014–17
 Flávio Conceição – Borussia Dortmund – 2003–04
 Douglas Costa – Bayern Munich – 2015–17, 2020–21
 Rodrigo Costa – 1860 Munich – 2002–04
 Philippe Coutinho - Bayern Munich – 2019–20
 Cris – Bayer Leverkusen – 2002–03
 Matheus Cunha – RB Leipzig, Hertha BSC – 2018–22
 Dante – Borussia M'gladbach, Bayern Munich, VfL Wolfsburg – 2008–16
 Dedê – Borussia Dortmund – 1998–2011
 Deyverson – 1. FC Köln – 2014–15
 Didi – VfB Stuttgart – 1999–2000
 Diego – Werder Bremen, VfL Wolfsburg – 2006–09, 2010–11, 2012–14
 Jean Carlos Dondé – Hamburger SV – 2004–05
 Dunga – VfB Stuttgart – 1993–95
 Edu – VfL Bochum, Mainz 05, Schalke 04, Greuther Fürth – 2003–05, 2006–07, 2009–13
 Carlos Eduardo – 1899 Hoffenheim – 2008–10

 Giovane Élber – VfB Stuttgart, Bayern Munich, Borussia M'gladbach – 1994–2004, 2005–06
 Élson – VfB Stuttgart, Hannover 96 – 2004–05, 2008–11
 Emerson – Bayer Leverkusen – 1997–2000
 Luiz Firmino Emerson – Hamburger SV, FC St. Pauli – 1991–92, 1996–97
 Luciano Emílio – 1. FC Köln – 1997–98
 Evanílson – Borussia Dortmund, 1. FC Köln – 1999–2006
 Ewerthon – Borussia Dortmund, VfB Stuttgart – 2001–05, 2007–08
 Ewerton– 1. FC Nürnberg – 2018–19
 Fabrício – 1899 Hoffenheim – 2008–09
 Fagner – VfL Wolfsburg – 2012–13
 Felipe – Hannover 96 – 2012–13, 2014–16, 2017–19
 Roberto Firmino – 1899 Hoffenheim – 2010–15
 Leandro Fonseca – SSV Ulm, Hannover 96 – 1999–2000, 2004–05
 França – Bayer Leverkusen – 2002–05
 Franklin – VfB Leipzig, Energie Cottbus – 1993–94, 2000–03
 Pedro Geromel – 1. FC Köln – 2008–12
 Gilberto – Hertha BSC – 2004–08
 Gláuber – 1. FC Nürnberg – 2005–08
 Gledson – Hansa Rostock – 2007–08
 Heurelho Gomes – 1899 Hoffenheim – 2012–13

 Grafite – VfL Wolfsburg – 2007–11
 Luiz Gustavo – 1899 Hoffenheim, Bayern Munich, VfL Wolfsburg – 2008–17
 Henrique – Bayer Leverkusen – 2008–09
 Bruno Henrique – VfL Wolfsburg – 2015–17
 Ramon Hubner – Bayer Leverkusen – 1995–96
 Iago – FC Augsburg – 2019–
 João Victor – VfL Wolfsburg – 2019–21
 Joelinton – 1899 Hoffenheim – 2015–16, 2018–19
 Jonathas – Hannover 96 – 2017–19
 Jorginho – Bayer Leverkusen, Bayern Munich – 1989–95
 Josué – VfL Wolfsburg – 2007–13
 Juan – Bayer Leverkusen – 2002–07
 Júnior – 1. FC Kaiserslautern, 1. FC Nürnberg – 1998–99, 2001–03
 Fábio Júnior – VfL Bochum – 2006–07
 Roque Júnior – Bayer Leverkusen, MSV Duisburg – 2004–08
 Kahê – Borussia M'gladbach – 2005–07
 Kaká – Hertha BSC – 2008–10
 Klauss – 1899 Hoffenheim – 2020–21
 Kléber – Hannover 96 – 2003–04
 Leandro – Borussia Dortmund – 2002–04
 André Lima – Hertha BSC – 2007–08
 Lincoln – 1. FC Kaiserslautern, Schalke 04 – 2001–07
 Felipe Lopes – VfL Wolfsburg, VfB Stuttgart – 2011–13
 Lúcio (Lucimar Ferreira da Silva) – Bayer Leverkusen, Bayern Munich – 2000–09
 Lúcio (Lúcio Carlos Cajueiro Souza) – Hertha BSC – 2007–09
 Luizão – Hertha BSC – 2002–04
 Maicon – MSV Duisburg – 2007–08
 Maicosuel – 1899 Hoffenheim – 2009–10
 Leonardo Manzi – FC St. Pauli – 1989–91, 1995–96
 Marcão – FC St. Pauli – 2001–02
 Marcelinho – Hertha BSC, VfL Wolfsburg – 2001–08
 Marcelo – Hannover 96 – 2013–16
 Luciano Martins – FC Homburg – 1987–88
 Mazinho – Bayern Munich – 1991–95
 Mineiro – Hertha BSC, Schalke 04 – 2006–08, 2009–10
 Diego Morais – Hansa Rostock – 2007–08
 Naldo – Werder Bremen, VfL Wolfsburg, Schalke 04 – 2005–10, 2011–19
 Nando – Hamburger SV – 1989–92
 Vivaldo Nascimento – Eintracht Frankfurt – 2003–04
 Bruno Nazário – 1899 Hoffenheim – 2013–14
 Nenê – Hertha BSC – 2002–03
 Gustavo Nery – Werder Bremen – 2004–05
 Thiago Neves – Hamburger SV – 2008–09
 Orestes – Hansa Rostock – 2007–08
Paulo Otávio – VfL Wolfsburg – 2019–
 Paulinho – Bayer Leverkusen – 2018–20
 Matheus Pereira – 1. FC Nürnberg – 2018–19
 Lucas Piazon – Eintracht Frankfurt – 2014–15
 Marcelo Pletsch – Borussia M'gladbach, 1. FC Kaiserslautern – 2001–06
 Robson Ponte – Bayer Leverkusen, VfL Wolfsburg – 1999–2005
 Rafael – 1860 Munich – 2002–03
 Raffael – Hertha BSC, Schalke 04, Borussia M'gladbach – 2007–10, 2011–20
 Rafinha – Schalke 04, Bayern Munich – 2005–10, 2011–19
 André Ramalho – Bayer Leverkusen, Mainz 05 – 2015–2018
 Ratinho – 1. FC Kaiserslautern – 1997–2003
 Reinier – Borussia Dortmund – 2020–22
 Rodnei – Hertha BSC, 1. FC Kaiserslautern – 2008–09, 2010–12
 Lucas Ribeiro – 1899 Hoffenheim – 2019–20
 Rodrigo Chagas – Bayer Leverkusen – 1995–96
 Roger – FC Ingolstadt – 2015–17
 Rômulo – Mainz 05 – 2005–06
 Ronny – Hertha BSC – 2011–12, 2013–16
 Felipe Santana – Borussia Dortmund, Schalke 04 – 2008–15
 Douglas Santos – Hamburger SV – 2016–18
 Fernando Santos – 1860 Munich, MSV Duisburg – 2003–04, 2007–08
 Paulo Sérgio – Bayer Leverkusen, Bayern Munich – 1993–97, 1999–2002
 Sidney – Energie Cottbus – 2006–07

 Alessandro da Silva – Eintracht Frankfurt – 1992–93
 Alex Silva – Hamburger SV – 2008–09
 Antonio da Silva – Mainz 05, VfB Stuttgart, Karlsruher SC, Borussia Dortmund – 2004–09, 2010–12
 Geovani Silva – Karlsruher SC – 1990–91
 Leandro da Silva – 1. FC Nürnberg – 2004–05
 Vragel da Silva – Energie Cottbus – 2001–03, 2006–09
 Danilo Soares – FC Ingolstadt, VfL Bochum – 2015–16, 2021–
 Raoul Tagliari – Meidericher SV – 1964–66
 Tinga – Borussia Dortmund – 2006–10
 Tita – Bayer Leverkusen – 1987–88
 Tuta – Eintracht Frankfurt – 2020–
 Vinícius – Hannover 96 – 2002–09
 Walace – Hamburger SV, Hannover 96 – 2016–19
 Wellington – 1899 Hoffenheim – 2008–10
 Wendell – Bayer Leverkusen – 2014–21
 Wesley – Werder Bremen – 2010–12
 William – VfL Wolfsburg, Schalke 04 – 2017–22
 Zé Elias – Bayer Leverkusen – 1996–97
 Zé Roberto (José Roberto da Silva Júnior) – Bayer Leverkusen, Bayern Munich, Hamburger SV – 1998–2006, 2007–11
 Zé Roberto (José Roberto de Oliveira) – Schalke 04 – 2007–08
 Zézé – 1. FC Köln – 1964–65

Chile
 Miiko Albornoz – Hannover 96 – 2014–16, 2017–19
 Charles Aránguiz – Bayer Leverkusen – 2015–
 Nicolás Castillo – Mainz 05 – 2014–15
 Marcelo Díaz – Hamburger SV – 2014–16
 Júnior Fernándes – Bayer Leverkusen – 2012–13
 Gonzalo Jara – Mainz 05 – 2014–16
 Waldo Ponce – VfL Wolfsburg – 2003–04
 Eduardo Vargas – 1899 Hoffenheim – 2015–17
 Arturo Vidal – Bayer Leverkusen, Bayern Munich – 2007–11, 2015–18

Colombia
 Santiago Arias – Bayer Leverkusen – 2020–21
 Éder Balanta – Schalke 04 – 2022–
 Jhon Córdoba – Mainz 05, Köln, Hertha BSC – 2015–18, 2019–21
 Faryd Mondragón – 1. FC Köln – 2008–11
 John Mosquera – Werder Bremen – 2007–08
 Michael Ortega – Bayer Leverkusen – 2011–12
 Juan José Perea – VfB Stuttgart – 2022–
 Adrián Ramos – Hertha BSC, Borussia Dortmund – 2009–10, 2011–12, 2013–17
 James Rodríguez – Bayern Munich – 2017–19
 Rafael Santos Borré – Eintracht Frankfurt – 2021–
 Jésus Sinisterra – Arminia Bielefeld – 2002–03
 Elkin Soto – Mainz 05 – 2006–07, 2009–16
 Adolfo Valencia – Bayern Munich – 1993–95

Ecuador
 Félix Borja – Mainz 05 – 2009–10
 Carlos Gruezo – VfB Stuttgart, FC Augsburg – 2013–16, 2019–
 Piero Hincapié – Bayer Leverkusen – 2021–
 Andersson Ordóñez – Eintracht Frankfurt – 2016–17

Paraguay
 Omar Alderete – Hertha BSC – 2020–21
 Lucas Barrios – Borussia Dortmund – 2009–12
 Raúl Bobadilla – Borussia M'gladbach, FC Augsburg – 2009–12, 2013–18
 Julio dos Santos – Bayern Munich – 2005–07
 Dario Lezcano – FC Ingolstadt – 2015–17
 Roque Santa Cruz – Bayern Munich – 1999–2007
 Jonathan Santana – VfL Wolfsburg – 2006–10
 Nelson Valdez – Werder Bremen, Borussia Dortmund, Eintracht Frankfurt – 2002–10, 2014–15
 Julio Villalba – Borussia M'gladbach – 2017–18

Peru

 Luis Advíncula – 1899 Hoffenheim – 2012–13
 Carlos Ascues – VfL Wolfsburg – 2015–16
 Julio Baylón – Fortuna Köln – 1973–74
 Jefferson Farfán – Schalke 04 – 2008–15
 Paolo Guerrero – Bayern Munich, Hamburger SV – 2004–12
 Percy Olivares – 1. FC Nürnberg – 1992–93
 Angel Augusto Palacios – Kickers Offenbach – 1983–84
 Claudio Pizarro – Werder Bremen, Bayern Munich, 1. FC Köln – 1999–2007, 2008–20
 Roberto Silva – Werder Bremen – 2001–02
 Carlos Zambrano – Schalke 04, FC St. Pauli, Eintracht Frankfurt – 2009–11, 2012–16

Uruguay
 Juan Carlos Borteiro – Alemannia Aachen – 1967–68
 Pablo Cáceres – MSV Duisburg – 2007–08
 Carlos Grossmüller – Schalke 04 – 2007–09
 Darío Rodríguez – Schalke 04 – 2002–08
 Agustín Rogel – Hertha BSC – 2022–
 Vicente Sánchez – Schalke 04 – 2007–10
 Marcelo Saracchi – RB Leipzig – 2018–20
 Rubén Sosa – Borussia Dortmund – 1995–96
 Horacio Troche – Alemannia Aachen – 1967–68
 Guillermo Varela – Eintracht Frankfurt – 2016–17
 Gustavo Varela – Schalke 04 – 2002–08
 Rodrigo Zalazar – Schalke 04 – 2022–

Venezuela
 Juan Arango – Borussia M'gladbach – 2009–14
 Sergio Córdova – FC Augsburg, Arminia Bielefeld – 2017–22
 Yohandry Orozco – VfL Wolfsburg – 2011–13
 Tomás Rincón – Hamburger SV – 2008–14

CAF

Algeria
 Chadli Amri – Mainz 05, 1. FC Kaiserslautern – 2006–07, 2009–11
 Habib Bellaïd – Eintracht Frankfurt – 2008–09
 Abder Ramdane – Hansa Rostock, SC Freiburg – 1998–2002
 Nabil Bentaleb – Schalke 04 – 2016–19, 2020–21
 Ishak Belfodil – Werder Bremen, 1899 Hoffenheim, Hertha BSC – 2017–22
Ramy Bensebaini – Borussia M'gladbach – 2019–
 Ahmed Reda Madouni – Borussia Dortmund, Bayer Leverkusen – 2001–07
 Karim Matmour – Borussia M'gladbach, Eintracht Frankfurt – 2008–11, 2012–13
 Idir Ouali – SC Paderborn – 2014–15
 Salim Djefaflia – Hannover 96 – 2003–04
 Soufian Benyamina – VfB Stuttgart – 2012–13
 Antar Yahia – VfL Bochum, 1. FC Kaiserslautern – 2006–10, 2011–12
 Karim Ziani – VfL Wolfsburg – 2009–11
 Mounir Bouziane– Mainz 05 – 2016–17

Angola
Anderson Lucoqui – Arminia Bielefeld, Mainz 05 – 2020–
Rui Marques – SSV Ulm, VfB Stuttgart – 1999–2003
Miguel Pereira – Schalke 04 – 1993–95, 1996–99
Afimico Pululu – Arminia Bielefeld – 2021–22
Nando Rafael – Hertha BSC, Borussia M'gladbach, FC Augsburg, Fortuna Düsseldorf – 2002–07, 2011–13
José Pierre Vunguidica – 1. FC Köln – 2010–11

Benin
 Moudachirou Amadou – FC St. Pauli – 2001–02
 Moussa Latoundji – Energie Cottbus – 2000–03
 Cebio Soukou – Arminia Bielefeld – 2020–21

Burkina Faso
 Aristide Bancé – Mainz 05, FC Augsburg – 2009–10, 2012–13
 Alassane Ouédraogo – 1. FC Köln – 2000–02
 Jonathan Pitroipa – SC Freiburg, Hamburger SV – 2004–05, 2008–11
 Wilfried Sanou – SC Freiburg, 1. FC Köln – 2003–05, 2008–11
 Edmond Tapsoba – Bayer Leverkusen – 2019–

Cameroon
 Timothée Atouba – Hamburger SV – 2005–09
 Serge Branco – Eintracht Frankfurt, VfB Stuttgart – 2000–01, 2003–04
 Eric Maxim Choupo-Moting – Hamburger SV, 1. FC Nürnberg, Mainz 05, Schalke 04, Bayern Munich – 2007–08, 2009–17, 2020–
 Joël Epalle – VfL Bochum – 2006–10
 Franck Evina – Bayern Munich – 2017–18
 Mohammadou Idrissou – Hannover 96, MSV Duisburg, SC Freiburg, Borussia M'gladbach – 2002–06, 2007–08, 2009–11
 Samuel Ipoua – 1860 Munich – 2001–02
 Raymond Kalla – VfL Bochum – 2002–05
 Francis Kioyo – 1860 Munich, Energie Cottbus – 2003–04, 2006–08
 Dorge Kouemaha – 1. FC Kaiserslautern, Eintracht Frankfurt – 2011–13
 Pierre Kunde – Mainz 05, VfL Bochum – 2018–21, 2023-
 Léonard Kweuke – Eintracht Frankfurt – 2008–09
 Georges Mandjeck – VfB Stuttgart – 2008–09
 Joël Matip – Schalke 04 – 2009–16
 Marvin Matip – VfL Bochum, 1. FC Köln, FC Ingolstadt – 2004–06, 2008–10, 2015–17
 Lucien Mettomo – 1. FC Kaiserslautern – 2003–06
 Marcel Ndjeng – Arminia Bielefeld, Borussia M'gladbach, Hamburger SV, FC Augsburg, Hertha BSC – 2006–07, 2008–09, 2011–12, 2013–15
 Georges Ndoum – MSV Duisburg – 2007–08
 Louis Ngwat-Mahop – Bayern Munich – 2006–07
 Patrick Njambe – Borussia Dortmund – 2007–08
 Paul-Georges Ntep – VfL Wolfsburg – 2016–18
 Edgar Salli – 1. FC Nürnberg – 2018–19
 Rigobert Song – 1. FC Köln – 2001–02
 Alphonse Tchami – Hertha BSC – 1997–99
 Joël Tchami – Hertha BSC – 2001–02
 Bill Tchato – 1. FC Kaiserslautern – 2002–05
 Somen Tchoyi – FC Augsburg – 2012–13
 Pierre Womé – Werder Bremen, 1. FC Köln – 2006–07, 2008–10
 Jacques Zoua – Hamburger SV – 2013–14

Congo
 Silvère Ganvoula – VfL Bochum – 2021–
 Rolf-Christel Guié-Mien – Karlsruher SC, Eintracht Frankfurt, SC Freiburg, 1. FC Köln – 1997–98, 1999–2001, 2003–04, 2005–06
 Christopher Samba – Hertha BSC – 2005–07
 Jean Tsoumou-Madza – Eintracht Frankfurt – 2003–04
 Macchambes Younga-Mouhani – Borussia M'gladbach, Fortuna Düsseldorf – 1995–97

Democratic Republic of Congo
Until 1997 named Zaire
 Chadrac Akolo – VfB Stuttgart – 2017–19
 Jean-Kasongo Banza – VfL Wolfsburg – 1999–2000
 Michél Mazingu-Dinzey – VfB Stuttgart, FC St. Pauli, Hertha BSC, 1860 Munich – 1994–96, 1997–2000
 Elias Kachunga – Borussia M'gladbach, SC Paderborn, FC Ingolstadt – 2010–11, 2014–16 
 Etepe Kakoko – VfB Stuttgart – 1981–82
 Wilson Kamavuaka – 1. FC Nürnberg, Darmstadt 98 – 2011–12, 2016–17
 Domi Kumbela – Eintracht Braunschweig – 2013–14
 Nzelo Hervé Lembi – 1. FC Kaiserslautern – 2002–06
 Assani Lukimya – Hansa Rostock, Werder Bremen – 2007–08, 2012–16
 Cédric Makiadi – VfL Wolfsburg, SC Freiburg, Werder Bremen – 2004–07, 2009–15
 Dieumerci Mbokani – VfL Wolfsburg – 2010–11
 Addy-Waku Menga – Hansa Rostock – 2007–08
 Jean-Santos Muntubila – 1. FC Saarbrücken – 1985–86
 Kosi Saka – Borussia Dortmund – 2005–07
 Silas – VfB Stuttgart – 2020–
 Marcel Tisserand – FC Ingolstadt, VfL Wolfsburg – 2016–20

Egypt
 Mohamed Emara – Hansa Rostock – 1998–2002
 Ahmed Salah Hosny – VfB Stuttgart – 1998–2001
 Samir Ibrahim – 1. FC Kaiserslautern – 1998–99
 Omar Marmoush – VfL Wolfsburg – 2019–
 Hany Ramzy – Werder Bremen, 1. FC Kaiserslautern – 1994–2004
 Radwan Yasser – Hansa Rostock – 1996–2002
 Mohamed Zidan – Werder Bremen, Mainz 05, Hamburger SV, Borussia Dortmund – 2004–12

Equatorial Guinea
 Ben Manga – Fortuna Düsseldorf – 1995–96

Gabon
 Pierre-Emerick Aubameyang – Borussia Dortmund – 2013–18

Gambia
 Dawda Bah – FC Augsburg – 2011–12
Leon Guwara – Werder Bremen, Darmstadt – 2015–17
Saidy Janko – VfL Bochum – 2022–
 Bakery Jatta – Hamburger SV – 2016–18
 Ousman Manneh – Werder Bremen – 2016–17

Ghana
 Kasim Adams Nuhu – 1899 Hoffenheim, Fortuna Düsseldorf – 2018–22
 Otto Addo – Borussia Dortmund, Mainz 05, Hamburger SV – 1999–2008
 Godfried Aduobe – Hansa Rostock, Karlsruher SC – 2002–05, 2007–09
 Lawrence Aidoo – Borussia M'gladbach, 1. FC Nürnberg, Energie Cottbus – 2001–05, 2006–07
 Charles Akonnor – VfL Wolfsburg – 1998–2003
 Stephan Ambrosius – Hamburger SV – 2017–18
 Matthew Amoah – Borussia Dortmund – 2005–07
 Opoku Ampomah – Fortuna Düsseldorf – 2019–20
 Anthony Annan – Schalke 04 – 2010–11, 2013–14
 Christopher Antwi-Adjei – SC Paderborn, VfL Bochum – 2019–20, 2021–
 Baba Rahman – Greuther Fürth, FC Augsburg, Schalke 04 – 2012–13, 2014–15, 2016–19
 Anthony Baffoe – 1. FC Köln, Fortuna Düsseldorf – 1983–84, 1989–92
 Isaac Boakye – Arminia Bielefeld, VfL Wolfsburg, 1. FC Nürnberg – 2004–08, 2009–11
 Derek Boateng – 1. FC Köln – 2008–09
 Kevin-Prince Boateng – Hertha BSC, Borussia Dortmund, Schalke 04, Eintracht Frankfurt – 2005–07, 2008–09, 2013–15, 2017–18, 2021–
 Davidson Eden – FC St. Pauli – 2010–11
 Bashiru Gambo – Borussia Dortmund – 1997–98, 1999–2000
 Ali Ibrahim – Wattenscheid 09 – 1990–94
 Abass Issah – Mainz 05 – 2018–19, 2020–21
 Awudu Issaka – 1860 Munich – 1998–99
 Samuel Kuffour – Bayern Munich – 1994–95, 1996–2005
 Daniel-Kofi Kyereh – Freiburg – 2022–
 Yahaya Mallam – Borussia Dortmund – 1994–97
 Alex Nyarko – Karlsruher SC – 1997–98
 Ebenezer Ofori – VfB Stuttgart – 2017–18
 Kelvin Ofori – Fortuna Düsseldorf – 2019–20
 Daniel Opare – FC Augsburg – 2015–16, 2017–18
 Alexander Opoku – VfB Leipzig – 1993–94
 Kwasi Okyere Wriedt – Bayern Munich – 2017–18, 2019–20
 Abedi Pele – 1860 Munich – 1996–98
 Christian Saba – Hertha BSC – 1998–99
 Edward Sarpei – 1. FC Köln – 1993–94
 Hans Sarpei – VfL Wolfsburg, Bayer Leverkusen, Schalke 04 – 2001–11
 Hans Nunoo Sarpei – VfB Stuttgart, Greuther Fürth – 2018–19, 2021–22
 Ibrahim Sunday – Werder Bremen – 1975–76
 Prince Tagoe – 1899 Hoffenheim – 2009–12
 Charles Takyi – Hamburger SV, FC St. Pauli – 2005–06, 2010–11
 Ibrahim Tanko – Borussia Dortmund, SC Freiburg – 1994–2002, 2003–05
 Bernard Tekpetey – Schalke 04, Fortuna Düsseldorf – 2016–17, 2019–20
 Isaac Vorsah – 1899 Hoffenheim – 2008–12
 Anthony Yeboah – Eintracht Frankfurt, Hamburger SV – 1990–95, 1997–2002

Guinea
 Mamadou Bah – VfB Stuttgart – 2010–13
 Taifour Diané – Bayer Leverkusen – 1994–95
 Momo Cissé – VfB Stuttgart – 2020–21
 Simon Falette – Eintracht Frankfurt – 2017–20
 Sehrou Guirassy – 1. FC Köln – 2016–18
 Naby Keïta – RB Leipzig – 2016–18
Ilaix Moriba – RB Leipzig – 2021–
 Pablo Thiam – 1. FC Köln, VfB Stuttgart, Bayern Munich, VfL Wolfsburg – 1994–2008
 Ibrahima Traoré – Hertha BSC, VfB Stuttgart, Borussia M'gladbach – 2007–08, 2011–21

Guinea-Bissau
 Almami Moreira – Hamburger SV – 2004–05

Ivory Coast
 Arthur Boka – VfB Stuttgart – 2006–14
 Mathis Bolly – Fortuna Düsseldorf – 2012–13 
 Guy Demel – Borussia Dortmund, Hamburger SV – 2002–11
 Serey Die – VfB Stuttgart – 2014–16
 Constant Djakpa – Bayer Leverkusen, Hannover 96, Eintracht Frankfurt – 2008–11, 2012–16
 Jean-Philippe Gbamin – Mainz 05 – 2016–19
 Steve Gohouri – Borussia M'gladbach – 2006–07, 2008–09
Sébastien Haller – Eintracht Frankfurt, Borussia Dortmund – 2017–19, 2022-
Salomon Kalou – Hertha BSC – 2014–20
Arouna Koné – Hannover 96 – 2009–10
Odilon Kossounou – Bayer Leverkusen – 2021–
 Boubacar Sanogo – 1. FC Kaiserslautern, Hamburger SV, Werder Bremen, 1899 Hoffenheim – 2005–10
 Giovanni Sio – VfL Wolfsburg, FC Augsburg – 2011–14
 Ibrahim Sissoko – VfL Wolfsburg – 2011–12
 Didier Ya Konan – Hannover 96 – 2009–15

Mali
 Soumaila Coulibaly – SC Freiburg, Borussia M'gladbach – 2000–02, 2003–05, 2008–09
 Garra Dembélé – SC Freiburg – 2011–13
 Bakary Diakité – Mainz 05 – 2006–07
 Boubacar Diarra – SC Freiburg – 1998–2002, 2003–05
 Amadou Haidara – RB Leipzig – 2018–
 Diadie Samassékou – 1899 Hoffenheim – 2019–
 Almamy Touré – Eintracht Frankfurt – 2018–
 Sambou Yatabaré – Werder Bremen – 2015–17

Morocco
 Yacine Abdessadki – SC Freiburg – 2009–12
 Abdelaziz Ahanfouf – Hansa Rostock, SpVgg Unterhaching, MSV Duisburg, Arminia Bielefeld – 1999–2001, 2005–07
 Hamadi Al Ghaddioui – VfB Stuttgart – 2020–22
 Mohamed Amsif – FC Augsburg – 2011–14
 Ayman Azhil – Bayern Munich – 2022–
 Rachid Azzouzi – MSV Duisburg – 1991–92, 1993–95
 Aymen Barkok – Eintracht Frankfurt, Fortuna Düsseldorf, 1. FSV Mainz 05 – 2016–
 Younès Belhanda – Schalke 04 – 2015–16
 Mehdi Benatia – Bayern Munich – 2014–16
 Nassim Boujellab – Schalke 04 – 2018–21
 Mourad Bounoua – Eintracht Frankfurt – 1998–99
 Ouasim Bouy – Hamburger SV – 2013–14
 Adil Chihi – 1. FC Köln – 2008–12
 Nasir El Kasmi – MSV Duisburg – 2005–06
 Achraf Hakimi – Borussia Dortmund – 2018–20
Amine Harit – Schalke 04 – 2017–21
 Hamza Mendyl – Schalke 04 – 2018–19, 2020–21
 Noussair Mazraoui – Bayern Munich – 2022–
 Youssef Mokhtari – 1. FC Köln, MSV Duisburg – 2005–06, 2007–08
 Anas Ouahim – 1. FC Köln – 2017–18
 Abderrahim Ouakili – 1860 Munich – 1997–99
Abdelhamid Sabiri – Paderborn – 2019–20
 Hamid Termina – Energie Cottbus – 2001–02

Mozambique
 Ronny Marcos – Hamburger SV – 2014–15

Namibia
 Collin Benjamin – Hamburger SV – 2001–05, 2006–09, 2010–11
 Razundara Tjikuzu – Werder Bremen, Hansa Rostock, MSV Duisburg – 1999–2006

Nigeria
Dickson Abiama – Greuther Fürth – 2021–22
 Suleiman Abdullahi – Union Berlin – 2019–20
 Yakubu Adamu – FC St. Pauli – 2001–02
 Victor Agali – Hansa Rostock, Schalke 04 – 1998–2004, 2007–08
 Joseph Akpala – Werder Bremen – 2012–13
 Jonathan Akpoborie – Hansa Rostock, VfB Stuttgart, VfL Wolfsburg – 1995–2001
 Kevin Akpoguma – 1899 Hoffenheim, Hannover 96 – 2017–
 Tolu Arokodare – 1. FC Köln – 2020–21
 Taiwo Awoniyi – Mainz 05, Union Berlin – 2019–22
 Haruna Babangida – Mainz 05 – 2010–11
 Leon Balogun – Hannover 96, Werder Bremen, Fortuna Düsseldorf, Mainz 05 – 2008–11, 2012–13, 2015–18
 Noah Sarenren Bazee – Hannover 96, FC Augsburg – 2015–16, 2017–
 Jamilu Collins – SC Paderborn – 2019–20
 Emmanuel Dennis – 1. FC Köln – 2020–21
 Kingsley Ehizibue – 1. FC Köln – 2019–
 Chidera Ejuke – Hertha BSC – 2022–
 Emeka Ifejiagwa – VfL Wolfsburg – 2000–01
 Victor Ikpeba – Borussia Dortmund – 1999–2001
 Henry Isaac (Nwosu) – Eintracht Frankfurt – 1998–99
 Manasseh Ishiaku – MSV Duisburg, 1. FC Köln – 2007–10
 Abdul Iyodo – Schalke 04 – 2002–03
 Ademola Lookman – RB Leipzig – 2017–18, 2019–20
 Obafemi Martins – VfL Wolfsburg – 2009–10
 Gabriel Melkam – Hansa Rostock – 2003–05
 Abiodun Obafemi – Fortuna Düsseldorf – 1996–97
 Chinedu Obasi – 1899 Hoffenheim, Schalke 04 – 2008–15
 Victor Obinna – Darmstadt 98 – 2016–17
 Chima Okoroji – SC Freiburg – 2018–19
 Peter Ogaba – MSV Duisburg – 1993–94
 Adebowale Ogungbure – 1. FC Nürnberg – 2001–02
 Pascal Ojigwe – 1. FC Kaiserslautern, Bayer Leverkusen, Borussia M'gladbach – 1997–99, 2000–04
 Jay-Jay Okocha – Eintracht Frankfurt – 1992–96
 Solomon Okoronkwo – Hertha BSC – 2005–08
 Seyi Olajengbesi – SC Freiburg – 2003–05
 Sunday Oliseh – 1. FC Köln, Borussia Dortmund, VfL Bochum – 1995–97, 2000–05
 Victor Osimhen – VfL Wolfsburg – 2016–18
 Anthony Ujah – Mainz 05, 1. FC Köln, Werder Bremen, Union Berlin – 2011–12, 2014–16, 2017–22
 Eke Uzoma – SC Freiburg – 2009–10
 Taribo West – 1. FC Kaiserslautern – 2001–02

Senegal

 Demba Ba – 1899 Hoffenheim – 2008–11
 Papiss Cissé – SC Freiburg – 2009–12
 Mamadou Diabang – Arminia Bielefeld, VfL Bochum – 2002–05
 Fallou Diagne – SC Freiburg, Werder Bremen – 2011–14, 2016–17
Abdou Diallo – Mainz 05, Borussia Dortmund, RB Leipzig – 2017–19, 2022–
 Mamadou Diallo – MSV Duisburg – 1998–99
 Dame Diouf – Hannover 96 – 2002–03
 Mame Biram Diouf – Hannover 96 – 2011–14
 Baye Djiby Fall – Greuther Fürth – 2012–13
 Papy Djilobodji – Werder Bremen – 2015–16
 Ricardo Faty – Bayer Leverkusen – 2007–08
 Louis Gomis – 1. FC Nürnberg – 2001–02
 Babacar Guèye – SC Paderborn – 2019–20
Ismail Jakobs – 1. FC Köln – 2019–21
Sadio Mané – Bayern Munich – 2022–
 Jackson Mendy – SC Freiburg – 2009–10
 Babacar N'Diaye – Hannover 96 – 2002–03
 Moussa Niakhaté – Mainz 05 – 2018–22
 Mame Niang – VfL Wolfsburg – 2007–08
 Lamine Sané – Werder Bremen – 2016–18
 Salif Sané – Hannover 96, Schalke 04 – 2013–16, 2017–21
 Souleyman Sané – 1. FC Nürnberg, Wattenscheid 09 – 1988–94
 Bouna Sarr – Bayern Munich – 2020–
 Mickaël Tavares – Hamburger SV, 1. FC Nürnberg – 2008–10

Sierra Leone
 Gibril Sankoh – FC Augsburg – 2011–13

South Africa
 Delron Buckley – VfL Bochum, Arminia Bielefeld, Borussia Dortmund – 1996–99, 2000–01, 2002–06, 2007–09
 Bradley Carnell – VfB Stuttgart, Borussia M'gladbach, Karlsruher SC – 1998–2005, 2007–09
 Lance Davids – 1860 Munich – 2003–04
 Rowen Fernández – Arminia Bielefeld – 2007–08
 Rowan Hendricks – Eintracht Frankfurt – 1999–2000
 Glenn Jordens – Darmstadt 98 – 1981–82
 Siyabonga Nkosi – Arminia Bielefeld – 2007–09
 Steven Pienaar – Borussia Dortmund – 2006–07
 Sibusiso Zuma – Arminia Bielefeld – 2005–08

Togo
 Ihlas Bebou – Hannover 96, 1899 Hoffenheim – 2017–
 Peniel Mlapa – 1899 Hoffenheim, Borussia M'gladbach – 2010–14
 Dikeni Salifou – Werder Bremen – 2022–
 Bachirou Salou – Borussia M'gladbach, MSV Duisburg, Borussia Dortmund, Eintracht Frankfurt, Hansa Rostock – 1990–95, 1996–2003
 Assimiou Touré – Bayer Leverkusen – 2006–07, 2009–10

Tunisia
 Aymen Abdennour – Werder Bremen – 2009–10
 Sami Allagui – Mainz 05, Hertha BSC – 2010–12, 2013–15, 2016–17
 Zoubeir Baya – SC Freiburg – 1998–2001
 Mehdi Ben Slimane – SC Freiburg – 1998–2000
 Änis Ben-Hatira – Hamburger SV, Hertha BSC, Eintracht Frankfurt, Darmstadt 98 – 2006–09, 2010–12, 2013–17
 Sofian Chahed – Hertha BSC, Hannover 96 – 2003–04, 2005–13
 Adel Chedli – 1. FC Nürnberg – 2005–06
 Amine Chermiti – Hertha BSC – 2008–09
 Nejmeddin Daghfous – Mainz 05 – 2012–13
 Mohamed Dräger – SC Freiburg, SC Paderborn – 2017–18, 2019–20
 Jeremy Dudziak – Borussia Dortmund, Greuther Fürth – 2014–15, 2021–22
 Mohamed Gouaida – Hamburger SV – 2014–15, 2017–18
 Marouene Guezmir – SC Freiburg – 1996–97
 Karim Haggui – Bayer Leverkusen, Hannover 96, VfB Stuttgart – 2006–14
 Ammar Jemal – 1. FC Köln – 2011–12
 Salim Khelifi – Eintracht Braunschweig – 2013–14
 Aïssa Laïdouni – Union Berlin – 2022–
 Jawhar Mnari – 1. FC Nürnberg – 2005–08, 2009–10
 Hamed Namouchi – SC Freiburg – 2009–10
 Adel Sellimi – SC Freiburg – 1998–2002
 Ellyes Skhiri – 1. FC Köln – 2019–

Uganda
 Herbert Bockhorn – VfL Bochum – 2021–22
 Melvyn Lorenzen – Werder Bremen – 2013–16

Zambia
 Christopher Katongo – Arminia Bielefeld – 2008–09
 Moses Sichone – 1. FC Köln, Alemannia Aachen – 2000–02, 2003–04, 2006–07
 Andrew Sinkala – Bayern Munich, 1. FC Köln, FC Augsburg – 1999–2002, 2003–04, 2005–06, 2011–12

Zimbabwe
 Knowledge Musona – 1899 Hoffenheim, FC Augsburg – 2011–13

AFC

Australia
 Paul Agostino – 1860 Munich – 1997–2004
 Michael Beauchamp – 1. FC Nürnberg – 2006–08
 Brandon Borrello – SC Freiburg – 2019–20
 Hayden Foxe – Arminia Bielefeld – 1997–98
 Ajdin Hrustic – Eintracht Frankfurt – 2020–22
 Frank Juric – Bayer Leverkusen, Hannover 96 – 1999–2001, 2002–03, 2005–06
 Joshua Kennedy – VfL Wolfsburg, 1. FC Köln, 1. FC Nürnberg, Karlsruher SC – 2000–02, 2003–04, 2006–09
 Robbie Kruse – Fortuna Düsseldorf, Bayer Leverkusen, VfB Stuttgart – 2012–16
 Alou Kuol – VfB Stuttgart – 2022–
 Mitchell Langerak – Borussia Dortmund, VfB Stuttgart – 2010–16
 Mathew Leckie – Borussia M'gladbach, FC Ingolstadt, Hertha BSC – 2011–12, 2015–21
 David Mitchell – Eintracht Frankfurt – 1985–87
 Craig Moore – Borussia M'gladbach – 2004–05
 Damian Mori – Borussia M'gladbach – 1996–97
 Nikita Rukavytsya – Hertha BSC, Mainz 05 – 2011–13
 Mark Schwarzer – Dynamo Dresden, 1. FC Kaiserslautern – 1994–96
 Matthew Špiranović – 1. FC Nürnberg – 2006–08, 2009–10
 George Timotheou – Schalke 04 – 2018–19
 Dario Vidošić – 1. FC Nürnberg – 2007–08, 2009–11
 David Zdrilić – SSV Ulm, SpVgg Unterhaching – 1999–2001
 Ned Zelić – Borussia Dortmund, Eintracht Frankfurt, 1860 Munich – 1992–96, 1997–2002

Cambodia
 Chhunly Pagenburg – 1. FC Nürnberg – 2005–08

China PR
 Hao Junmin – Schalke 04 – 2009–11
 Shao Jiayi – 1860 Munich, Energie Cottbus – 2002–04, 2006–09
 Yang Chen – Eintracht Frankfurt – 1998–2001

Iran
 Sardar Azmoun – Bayer Leverkusen – 2021–
 Karim Bagheri – Arminia Bielefeld – 1997–99
 Khodadad Azizi – 1. FC Köln – 1997–98
 Ali Daei – Arminia Bielefeld, Bayern Munich, Hertha BSC – 1997–2002
 Mehdi Mahdavikia – VfL Bochum, Hamburger SV, Eintracht Frankfurt – 1999–2010
 Vahid Hashemian – Hamburger SV, VfL Bochum, Bayern Munich, Hannover 96 – 1999–2010
 Rasoul Khatibi – Hamburger SV – 1999–2000
 Alireza Mansourian – FC St. Pauli – 2001–02
 Ferydoon Zandi – 1.FC Kaiserslautern – 2004–06
 Ashkan Dejagah – Hertha BSC, VfL Wolfsburg – 2004–13
 Ali Karimi – Bayern Munich, Schalke 04 – 2005–07, 2011
 Amir Shapourzadeh – Hansa Rostock – 2005–06, 2007–08
 Daniel Davari – Eintracht Braunschweig – 2013–14

Japan
 Takuma Asano – VfB Stuttgart, Hannover 96, VfL Bochum – 2017–19, 2021–
 Ritsu Doan – Arminia Bielefeld, Freiburg – 2020–21, 2022-
 Keita Endo – Union Berlin – 2020–22
 Wataru Endo – VfB Stuttgart – 2020–
 Genki Haraguchi – Hertha BSC, Hannover 96, Union Berlin, VfB Stuttgart – 2014–19, 2021–
 Makoto Hasebe – VfL Wolfsburg, 1. FC Nürnberg, Eintracht Frankfurt – 2007–
 Hajime Hosogai – FC Augsburg, Bayer Leverkusen, Hertha BSC – 2011–15
 Junichi Inamoto – Eintracht Frankfurt – 2007–09
 Takashi Inui – Eintracht Frankfurt – 2012–16
 Ko Itakura – Borussia Mönchengladbach – 2022–
 Hiroki Ito – VfB Stuttgart – 2021–
 Tatsuya Ito – Hamburger SV – 2017–18
 Shinji Kagawa – Borussia Dortmund – 2010–12, 2014–19
 Daichi Kamada – Eintracht Frankfurt – 2017–18, 2019–
 Mu Kanazaki – 1. FC Nürnberg – 2012–13
 Hiroshi Kiyotake – 1. FC Nürnberg, Hannover 96 – 2012–16
 Soichiro Kozuki – Schalke 04 – 2022–
 Yuya Kubo – 1. FC Nürnberg – 2018–19
 Tomoaki Makino – 1. FC Köln – 2010–12
 Mitsuru Maruoka – Borussia Dortmund – 2014–15
 Yoshinori Muto – Mainz 05 – 2015–18
 Kazuki Nagasawa – 1. FC Köln – 2014–16
 Shinji Okazaki – VfB Stuttgart, Mainz 05 – 2010–15
 Yoshito Ōkubo – VfL Wolfsburg – 2008–09
 Yasuhiko Okudera – 1. FC Köln, Werder Bremen – 1977–86
 Masaya Okugawa – Arminia Bielefeld – 2020–22
 Genki Omae – Fortuna Düsseldorf – 2012–13
 Shinji Ono – VfL Bochum – 2007–10
 Yuya Osako – 1. FC Köln, Werder Bremen – 2014–21
 Yūki Ōtsu – Borussia M'gladbach – 2011–12
 Kazuo Ozaki – Arminia Bielefeld, FC St. Pauli – 1983–85, 1988–89
 Gōtoku Sakai – VfB Stuttgart, Hamburger SV – 2011–18
 Hiroki Sakai – Hannover 96 – 2012–16
 Naohiro Takahara – Hamburger SV, Eintracht Frankfurt – 2002–08
 Atsuto Uchida – Schalke 04 – 2010–15
 Takashi Usami – Bayern Munich, 1899 Hoffenheim, FC Augsburg, Fortuna Düsseldorf – 2011–13, 2016–17, 2018–19
 Hotaru Yamaguchi – Hannover 96 – 2015–16
 Kisho Yano – SC Freiburg – 2010–11
 Maya Yoshida – Schalke 04 – 2022–

Korea DPR
 Jong Tae-se – 1. FC Köln – 2011–12

Korea Republic
 Ahn Jung-hwan – MSV Duisburg – 2005–06
 Cha Bum-kun – Darmstadt 98, Eintracht Frankfurt, Bayer Leverkusen – 1978–89
 Cha Du-ri – Arminia Bielefeld, Eintracht Frankfurt, Mainz 05, SC Freiburg, Fortuna Düsseldorf – 2002–04, 2005–07, 2009–10, 2012–13
 Hong Jeong-ho – FC Augsburg – 2013–16
 Hwang Hee-chan – RB Leipzig – 2020–21
 Jeong Woo-yeong – Bayern Munich, SC Freiburg – 2018–19, 2020–
 Ji Dong-won – FC Augsburg, Mainz 05 – 2012–21
 Kim Jin-su – 1899 Hoffenheim – 2014–16
 Kim Joo-sung – VfL Bochum – 1992–93
 Koo Ja-cheol – VfL Wolfsburg, FC Augsburg, Mainz 05 – 2010–19
 Kwon Chang-hoon – SC Freiburg – 2019–21
 Lee Dong-gook – Werder Bremen – 2000–01
 Lee Dong-jun – Hertha BSC – 2021–22
 Lee Jae-sung – Mainz 05 – 2021–
 Lee Young-pyo – Borussia Dortmund – 2008–09
 Park Joo-ho – Mainz 05, Borussia Dortmund – 2013–17
 Park Jung-bin – Greuther Fürth – 2012–13
 Park Sang-in – MSV Duisburg – 1981–82
 Ryu Seung-woo – Bayer Leverkusen – 2013–14
 Son Heung-min – Hamburger SV, Bayer Leverkusen – 2010–16

Lebanon
 Roda Antar – Hamburger SV, SC Freiburg, 1. FC Köln – 2001–05, 2008–09
 Youssef Mohamad – SC Freiburg, 1. FC Köln – 2004–05, 2008–11

Philippines
 Dennis Cagara – Hertha BSC – 2003–04
 Gerrit Holtmann – Mainz 05, SC Paderborn, VfL Bochum – 2016–20, 2021–
 Stephan Schröck – 1899 Hoffenheim, Eintracht Frankfurt – 2012–14
 Denis Wolf – Hannover 96 – 2003–04

Tajikistan
 Alexander Huber – Eintracht Frankfurt – 2006–07

Thailand
 Witthaya Hloagune – Hertha BSC – 1979–80

CONCACAF

Canada
 Rob Friend – Borussia M'gladbach – 2008–10
 Alphonso Davies – Bayern Munich – 2018–
 Julian de Guzman – Hannover 96 – 2002–05
 Daniel Imhof – VfL Bochum – 2006–10
 Simeon Jackson – Eintracht Braunschweig – 2013–14
 Marcel de Jong – FC Augsburg – 2011–15
 Kevin McKenna – Energie Cottbus, 1. FC Köln – 2000–01, 2006–07, 2008–12
 Olivier Occéan – Eintracht Frankfurt – 2012–13
 Paul Stalteri – Werder Bremen, Borussia M'gladbach – 2000–05, 2008–10

Costa Rica
 Austin Berry – SC Freiburg – 1993–94
 Juan Cayasso – Stuttgarter Kickers – 1991–92
 Júnior Díaz – Mainz 05, Darmstadt 98 – 2012–16
 Cristian Gamboa – VfL Bochum – 2021–

Jamaica
 Leon Bailey – Bayer Leverkusen – 2016–21
 Daniel Gordon – Borussia Dortmund – 2006–08
 Michael Hector – Eintracht Frankfurt – 2016–17

Mexico
 Marco Fabián – Eintracht Frankfurt – 2015–19
 Aarón Galindo – Eintracht Frankfurt – 2007–09
 Andrés Guardado – Bayer Leverkusen – 2013–14
 Javier Hernández – Bayer Leverkusen – 2015–17
 Ricardo Osorio – VfB Stuttgart – 2006–10
 Pável Pardo – VfB Stuttgart – 2006–09
 Francisco Rodríguez – VfB Stuttgart – 2011–13
 Carlos Salcedo – Eintracht Frankfurt – 2017–19

Panama
 Andrés Andrade – Arminia Bielefeld – 2021–22

Suriname
 Sheraldo Becker – Union Berlin – 2019–

Trinidad and Tobago
 Evans Wise – SSV Ulm – 1999–2000

United States
 Tyler Adams – RB Leipzig – 2018–22
 Bryan Arguez – Hertha BSC – 2007–08
 DaMarcus Beasley – Hannover 96 – 2010–11
 George Bello – Arminia Bielefeld – 2021–22
 Gregg Berhalter – Energie Cottbus – 2002–03
 Terrence Boyd – Darmstadt 98 – 2016–17
 Michael Bradley – Borussia M'gladbach – 2008–11
 John Brooks – Hertha BSC, VfL Wolfsburg, 1899 Hoffenheim – 2013–
 John van Buskirk – KFC Uerdingen – 1995–96
 Paul Caligiuri – FC St. Pauli – 1995–96
 Russell Canouse – 1899 Hoffenheim – 2015–16
 Conor Casey – Borussia Dortmund, Hannover 96, Mainz 05 – 2002–03, 2004–07
 Timothy Chandler – 1. FC Nürnberg, Eintracht Frankfurt – 2010–
 Justin Che – 1899 Hoffenheim – 2021–
 Steve Cherundolo – Hannover 96 – 2002–14
 Ricardo Clark – Eintracht Frankfurt – 2009–11
 Chad Deering – Schalke 04, VfL Wolfsburg – 1993–94, 1997–98
 Landon Donovan – Bayer Leverkusen, Bayern Munich – 2004–05, 2008–09
 Thomas Dooley – FC Homburg, 1. FC Kaiserslautern, Bayer Leverkusen, Schalke 04 – 1986–93, 1994–97
 John Doyle – VfB Leipzig – 1993–94
 Benny Feilhaber – Hamburger SV – 2006–07
 Cory Gibbs – FC St. Pauli – 2001–02
 Julian Green – Hamburger SV, Greuther Fürth – 2014–15, 2021–22
 Joseph-Claude Gyau – 1899 Hoffenheim, Borussia Dortmund – 2013–15
 Frankie Hejduk – Bayer Leverkusen – 1998–2001
 Kamani Hill – VfL Wolfsburg – 2006–07
Matthew Hoppe – Schalke 04 – 2020–21
 Aron Jóhannsson – Werder Bremen – 2015–19
 Fabian Johnson – VfL Wolfsburg, 1899 Hoffenheim, Borussia M'gladbach – 2009–20
 Jermaine Jones – Eintracht Frankfurt, Bayer Leverkusen, Schalke 04 – 2000–01, 2003–14
 Kasey Keller – Borussia M'gladbach – 2004–07
 Jerome Kiesewetter – VfB Stuttgart – 2014–15
 Jovan Kirovski – Borussia Dortmund – 1996–98
Lennard Maloney – Borussia Dortmund – 2021–22
 Michael Mason – Hamburger SV – 1994–97
 Andy Mate – Hamburger SV – 1964–65
 Clint Mathis – Hannover 96 – 2003–05
 Weston McKennie – Schalke 04 – 2016–20
 Alfredo Morales – Hertha BSC, FC Ingolstadt, Fortuna Düsseldorf – 2011–12, 2015–17, 2018–20
 Matt Okoh – 1860 Munich – 1996–97
 Kevin Paredes – VfL Wolfsburg – 2021–
 Michael Parkhurst – FC Augsburg – 2012–13
 Heath Pearce – Hansa Rostock – 2007–08
Jordan Pefok – 1. FC Union Berlin – 2022–
 Ricardo Pepi – FC Augsburg – 2021–
 Christian Pulisic – Borussia Dortmund – 2015–19
 David Regis – Karlsruher SC – 1997–98
 Claudio Reyna – Bayer Leverkusen, VfL Wolfsburg – 1995–99
Giovanni Reyna – Borussia Dortmund – 2019–
Chris Richards – Bayern Munich, 1899 Hoffenheim – 2019–22
 Anthony Sanneh – Hertha BSC, 1. FC Nürnberg – 1998–2003
 Josh Sargent – Werder Bremen – 2018–21
 Joe Scally – Borussia M'gladbach – 2021–
 Khiry Shelton – SC Paderborn – 2019–20
 Sebastian Soto – Hannover 96 – 2018–19
 Caleb Stanko – SC Freiburg – 2017–18
 Malik Tillman – Bayern Munich – 2021–22
 David Wagner – Eintracht Frankfurt, Schalke 04 – 1990–91, 1995–97
 Danny Williams – SC Freiburg, 1899 Hoffenheim – 2009–13
 Bobby Wood – Hamburger SV, Hannover 96 – 2016–19
 Peter Woodring – Hamburger SV – 1992–94
 Andrew Wooten – 1. FC Kaiserslautern – 2011–12
 Haji Wright – Schalke 04 – 2017–19
 Eric Wynalda – 1. FC Saarbrücken, VfL Bochum – 1992–93, 1994–95
 David Yelldell – Bayer Leverkusen – 2015–16
 Salvatore Zizzo – Hannover 96 – 2007–10
 Zack Steffen – Fortuna Düsseldorf – 2019–20

OFC

New Zealand
 Wynton Rufer – Werder Bremen – 1989–95
 Sarpreet Singh – Bayern Munich – 2019–20

See also
 List of Bundesliga players

Notes
Notes:

References:

References
 Fussballdaten.de
 Worldfootball.net

foreign
Germany
Association football player non-biographical articles
Expatriate footballers in Germany